

558001–558100 

|-bgcolor=#E9E9E9
| 558001 ||  || — || January 14, 2011 || Mount Lemmon || Mount Lemmon Survey ||  || align=right | 1.1 km || 
|-id=002 bgcolor=#d6d6d6
| 558002 ||  || — || April 8, 2006 || Kitt Peak || Spacewatch ||  || align=right | 2.5 km || 
|-id=003 bgcolor=#E9E9E9
| 558003 ||  || — || November 27, 2014 || Haleakala || Pan-STARRS ||  || align=right | 2.0 km || 
|-id=004 bgcolor=#d6d6d6
| 558004 ||  || — || July 11, 2010 || WISE || WISE || LIX || align=right | 3.1 km || 
|-id=005 bgcolor=#d6d6d6
| 558005 ||  || — || March 16, 2004 || Kitt Peak || Spacewatch ||  || align=right | 2.9 km || 
|-id=006 bgcolor=#d6d6d6
| 558006 ||  || — || November 2, 2013 || Catalina || CSS ||  || align=right | 3.4 km || 
|-id=007 bgcolor=#d6d6d6
| 558007 ||  || — || November 20, 2014 || Kitt Peak || Spacewatch ||  || align=right | 2.7 km || 
|-id=008 bgcolor=#E9E9E9
| 558008 ||  || — || November 14, 2014 || Kitt Peak || Spacewatch ||  || align=right data-sort-value="0.82" | 820 m || 
|-id=009 bgcolor=#C2FFFF
| 558009 ||  || — || November 28, 2014 || Mount Lemmon || Mount Lemmon Survey || L5 || align=right | 6.8 km || 
|-id=010 bgcolor=#E9E9E9
| 558010 ||  || — || January 14, 2011 || Mount Lemmon || Mount Lemmon Survey ||  || align=right | 1.2 km || 
|-id=011 bgcolor=#C2FFFF
| 558011 ||  || — || January 28, 2006 || Kitt Peak || Spacewatch || L5 || align=right | 9.1 km || 
|-id=012 bgcolor=#C2FFFF
| 558012 ||  || — || March 29, 2008 || Kitt Peak || Spacewatch || L5 || align=right | 7.6 km || 
|-id=013 bgcolor=#E9E9E9
| 558013 ||  || — || December 14, 2010 || Mount Lemmon || Mount Lemmon Survey ||  || align=right | 1.1 km || 
|-id=014 bgcolor=#d6d6d6
| 558014 ||  || — || October 5, 2013 || Haleakala || Pan-STARRS ||  || align=right | 2.3 km || 
|-id=015 bgcolor=#fefefe
| 558015 ||  || — || November 25, 2011 || Haleakala || Pan-STARRS || H || align=right data-sort-value="0.63" | 630 m || 
|-id=016 bgcolor=#d6d6d6
| 558016 ||  || — || October 23, 2013 || Haleakala || Pan-STARRS ||  || align=right | 3.4 km || 
|-id=017 bgcolor=#d6d6d6
| 558017 ||  || — || October 28, 2013 || Kitt Peak || Spacewatch ||  || align=right | 3.2 km || 
|-id=018 bgcolor=#d6d6d6
| 558018 ||  || — || October 7, 2013 || Mount Lemmon || Mount Lemmon Survey ||  || align=right | 3.0 km || 
|-id=019 bgcolor=#fefefe
| 558019 ||  || — || September 1, 2002 || Palomar || NEAT ||  || align=right | 1.0 km || 
|-id=020 bgcolor=#E9E9E9
| 558020 ||  || — || October 14, 2004 || Palomar || NEAT ||  || align=right | 2.6 km || 
|-id=021 bgcolor=#fefefe
| 558021 ||  || — || November 28, 2014 || Haleakala || Pan-STARRS || H || align=right data-sort-value="0.61" | 610 m || 
|-id=022 bgcolor=#d6d6d6
| 558022 ||  || — || October 16, 2007 || Mount Lemmon || Mount Lemmon Survey ||  || align=right | 3.3 km || 
|-id=023 bgcolor=#E9E9E9
| 558023 ||  || — || November 4, 2014 || Mount Lemmon || Mount Lemmon Survey ||  || align=right | 1.4 km || 
|-id=024 bgcolor=#E9E9E9
| 558024 ||  || — || August 18, 2009 || Kitt Peak || Spacewatch ||  || align=right | 1.3 km || 
|-id=025 bgcolor=#E9E9E9
| 558025 ||  || — || April 18, 2007 || Kitt Peak || Mount Lemmon Survey ||  || align=right | 2.3 km || 
|-id=026 bgcolor=#d6d6d6
| 558026 ||  || — || December 20, 2003 || Socorro || LINEAR ||  || align=right | 3.4 km || 
|-id=027 bgcolor=#E9E9E9
| 558027 ||  || — || September 27, 2009 || Mount Lemmon || Mount Lemmon Survey ||  || align=right | 2.0 km || 
|-id=028 bgcolor=#E9E9E9
| 558028 ||  || — || January 13, 2002 || Kitt Peak || Spacewatch ||  || align=right | 1.4 km || 
|-id=029 bgcolor=#fefefe
| 558029 ||  || — || November 17, 2006 || Mount Lemmon || Mount Lemmon Survey || H || align=right data-sort-value="0.52" | 520 m || 
|-id=030 bgcolor=#E9E9E9
| 558030 ||  || — || February 12, 2003 || Haleakala || AMOS ||  || align=right | 1.2 km || 
|-id=031 bgcolor=#E9E9E9
| 558031 ||  || — || September 12, 2005 || Kitt Peak || Spacewatch ||  || align=right | 1.4 km || 
|-id=032 bgcolor=#d6d6d6
| 558032 ||  || — || November 26, 2014 || Haleakala || Pan-STARRS ||  || align=right | 3.0 km || 
|-id=033 bgcolor=#d6d6d6
| 558033 ||  || — || August 25, 2012 || Haleakala || Pan-STARRS ||  || align=right | 3.3 km || 
|-id=034 bgcolor=#d6d6d6
| 558034 ||  || — || November 30, 2008 || Kitt Peak || Spacewatch ||  || align=right | 3.3 km || 
|-id=035 bgcolor=#fefefe
| 558035 ||  || — || June 19, 2013 || Haleakala || Pan-STARRS || H || align=right data-sort-value="0.50" | 500 m || 
|-id=036 bgcolor=#d6d6d6
| 558036 ||  || — || April 2, 2005 || Kitt Peak || Spacewatch ||  || align=right | 3.1 km || 
|-id=037 bgcolor=#d6d6d6
| 558037 ||  || — || September 23, 2008 || Kitt Peak || Spacewatch ||  || align=right | 1.9 km || 
|-id=038 bgcolor=#d6d6d6
| 558038 ||  || — || September 20, 2001 || Socorro || LINEAR ||  || align=right | 3.4 km || 
|-id=039 bgcolor=#E9E9E9
| 558039 ||  || — || May 7, 2013 || Kitt Peak || Spacewatch ||  || align=right | 2.3 km || 
|-id=040 bgcolor=#E9E9E9
| 558040 ||  || — || July 6, 2013 || Haleakala || Pan-STARRS ||  || align=right | 2.8 km || 
|-id=041 bgcolor=#d6d6d6
| 558041 ||  || — || October 9, 2008 || Catalina || CSS ||  || align=right | 3.3 km || 
|-id=042 bgcolor=#E9E9E9
| 558042 ||  || — || January 24, 2007 || Mount Lemmon || Mount Lemmon Survey ||  || align=right | 1.3 km || 
|-id=043 bgcolor=#d6d6d6
| 558043 ||  || — || April 28, 2011 || Kitt Peak || Spacewatch ||  || align=right | 2.9 km || 
|-id=044 bgcolor=#d6d6d6
| 558044 ||  || — || August 15, 2013 || Haleakala || Pan-STARRS ||  || align=right | 3.6 km || 
|-id=045 bgcolor=#E9E9E9
| 558045 ||  || — || October 28, 2014 || Haleakala || Pan-STARRS ||  || align=right | 1.7 km || 
|-id=046 bgcolor=#fefefe
| 558046 ||  || — || November 18, 2014 || Haleakala || Pan-STARRS || H || align=right data-sort-value="0.55" | 550 m || 
|-id=047 bgcolor=#fefefe
| 558047 ||  || — || November 25, 2014 || Haleakala || Pan-STARRS || H || align=right data-sort-value="0.56" | 560 m || 
|-id=048 bgcolor=#d6d6d6
| 558048 ||  || — || October 29, 2014 || Kitt Peak || Spacewatch ||  || align=right | 1.8 km || 
|-id=049 bgcolor=#E9E9E9
| 558049 ||  || — || November 21, 2014 || Haleakala || Pan-STARRS ||  || align=right | 1.7 km || 
|-id=050 bgcolor=#d6d6d6
| 558050 ||  || — || November 26, 2014 || Haleakala || Pan-STARRS ||  || align=right | 3.1 km || 
|-id=051 bgcolor=#d6d6d6
| 558051 ||  || — || December 20, 2004 || Mount Lemmon || Mount Lemmon Survey ||  || align=right | 2.6 km || 
|-id=052 bgcolor=#d6d6d6
| 558052 ||  || — || September 19, 1998 || Apache Point || SDSS Collaboration ||  || align=right | 2.2 km || 
|-id=053 bgcolor=#d6d6d6
| 558053 ||  || — || November 9, 2009 || Mount Lemmon || Mount Lemmon Survey ||  || align=right | 2.2 km || 
|-id=054 bgcolor=#d6d6d6
| 558054 ||  || — || September 19, 2007 || Kitt Peak || SDSS ||  || align=right | 2.8 km || 
|-id=055 bgcolor=#d6d6d6
| 558055 ||  || — || September 20, 1996 || Kitt Peak || Spacewatch ||  || align=right | 2.4 km || 
|-id=056 bgcolor=#d6d6d6
| 558056 ||  || — || November 27, 2013 || Haleakala || Pan-STARRS ||  || align=right | 2.7 km || 
|-id=057 bgcolor=#d6d6d6
| 558057 ||  || — || October 25, 2008 || Catalina || CSS ||  || align=right | 2.8 km || 
|-id=058 bgcolor=#d6d6d6
| 558058 ||  || — || November 26, 2014 || Haleakala || Pan-STARRS ||  || align=right | 2.0 km || 
|-id=059 bgcolor=#d6d6d6
| 558059 ||  || — || November 26, 2014 || Haleakala || Pan-STARRS ||  || align=right | 2.5 km || 
|-id=060 bgcolor=#E9E9E9
| 558060 ||  || — || November 16, 2014 || Mount Lemmon || Mount Lemmon Survey ||  || align=right | 1.9 km || 
|-id=061 bgcolor=#E9E9E9
| 558061 ||  || — || September 28, 2009 || Mount Lemmon || Mount Lemmon Survey ||  || align=right | 1.6 km || 
|-id=062 bgcolor=#E9E9E9
| 558062 ||  || — || November 23, 2014 || Haleakala || Pan-STARRS ||  || align=right | 1.8 km || 
|-id=063 bgcolor=#d6d6d6
| 558063 ||  || — || February 9, 2010 || Catalina || CSS ||  || align=right | 2.3 km || 
|-id=064 bgcolor=#E9E9E9
| 558064 ||  || — || November 26, 2014 || Haleakala || Pan-STARRS ||  || align=right | 1.8 km || 
|-id=065 bgcolor=#E9E9E9
| 558065 ||  || — || January 27, 2007 || Kitt Peak || Spacewatch ||  || align=right | 1.1 km || 
|-id=066 bgcolor=#d6d6d6
| 558066 ||  || — || June 15, 2012 || Mount Lemmon || Mount Lemmon Survey ||  || align=right | 2.0 km || 
|-id=067 bgcolor=#E9E9E9
| 558067 ||  || — || November 17, 2014 || Haleakala || Pan-STARRS ||  || align=right | 1.2 km || 
|-id=068 bgcolor=#E9E9E9
| 558068 ||  || — || September 16, 2009 || Kitt Peak || Spacewatch ||  || align=right | 1.6 km || 
|-id=069 bgcolor=#E9E9E9
| 558069 ||  || — || November 17, 2014 || Haleakala || Pan-STARRS ||  || align=right | 2.2 km || 
|-id=070 bgcolor=#E9E9E9
| 558070 ||  || — || November 17, 2014 || Haleakala || Pan-STARRS ||  || align=right | 1.2 km || 
|-id=071 bgcolor=#d6d6d6
| 558071 ||  || — || December 18, 2009 || Mount Lemmon || Mount Lemmon Survey ||  || align=right | 2.0 km || 
|-id=072 bgcolor=#E9E9E9
| 558072 ||  || — || August 17, 2009 || Kitt Peak || Spacewatch ||  || align=right | 1.8 km || 
|-id=073 bgcolor=#E9E9E9
| 558073 ||  || — || March 11, 2003 || Kitt Peak || Spacewatch ||  || align=right | 2.3 km || 
|-id=074 bgcolor=#E9E9E9
| 558074 ||  || — || November 21, 2014 || Haleakala || Pan-STARRS ||  || align=right | 2.2 km || 
|-id=075 bgcolor=#d6d6d6
| 558075 ||  || — || November 21, 2014 || Haleakala || Pan-STARRS ||  || align=right | 2.2 km || 
|-id=076 bgcolor=#d6d6d6
| 558076 ||  || — || September 6, 2013 || Kitt Peak || Spacewatch ||  || align=right | 2.3 km || 
|-id=077 bgcolor=#d6d6d6
| 558077 ||  || — || November 21, 2014 || Haleakala || Pan-STARRS ||  || align=right | 2.7 km || 
|-id=078 bgcolor=#d6d6d6
| 558078 ||  || — || September 13, 2013 || Mount Lemmon || Mount Lemmon Survey ||  || align=right | 2.4 km || 
|-id=079 bgcolor=#E9E9E9
| 558079 ||  || — || February 10, 2011 || Mount Lemmon || Mount Lemmon Survey ||  || align=right | 1.5 km || 
|-id=080 bgcolor=#E9E9E9
| 558080 ||  || — || January 8, 2011 || Mount Lemmon || Mount Lemmon Survey ||  || align=right | 1.6 km || 
|-id=081 bgcolor=#d6d6d6
| 558081 ||  || — || November 9, 2013 || Mount Lemmon || Mount Lemmon Survey ||  || align=right | 3.1 km || 
|-id=082 bgcolor=#E9E9E9
| 558082 ||  || — || October 17, 2009 || Kitt Peak || Spacewatch ||  || align=right | 1.6 km || 
|-id=083 bgcolor=#E9E9E9
| 558083 ||  || — || January 14, 2011 || Mount Lemmon || Mount Lemmon Survey ||  || align=right | 1.2 km || 
|-id=084 bgcolor=#d6d6d6
| 558084 ||  || — || September 3, 2008 || Kitt Peak || Spacewatch ||  || align=right | 1.7 km || 
|-id=085 bgcolor=#E9E9E9
| 558085 ||  || — || November 23, 2014 || Mount Lemmon || Mount Lemmon Survey ||  || align=right | 1.2 km || 
|-id=086 bgcolor=#d6d6d6
| 558086 ||  || — || August 30, 2002 || Kitt Peak || Spacewatch ||  || align=right | 1.9 km || 
|-id=087 bgcolor=#E9E9E9
| 558087 ||  || — || November 26, 2014 || Haleakala || Pan-STARRS ||  || align=right | 1.7 km || 
|-id=088 bgcolor=#d6d6d6
| 558088 ||  || — || November 29, 2014 || Haleakala || Pan-STARRS ||  || align=right | 2.2 km || 
|-id=089 bgcolor=#d6d6d6
| 558089 ||  || — || November 30, 2014 || Haleakala || Pan-STARRS ||  || align=right | 1.8 km || 
|-id=090 bgcolor=#d6d6d6
| 558090 ||  || — || September 23, 2008 || Mount Lemmon || Mount Lemmon Survey ||  || align=right | 2.2 km || 
|-id=091 bgcolor=#C2FFFF
| 558091 ||  || — || November 20, 2014 || Haleakala || Pan-STARRS || L5 || align=right | 10 km || 
|-id=092 bgcolor=#d6d6d6
| 558092 ||  || — || December 18, 2009 || Mount Lemmon || Mount Lemmon Survey ||  || align=right | 2.6 km || 
|-id=093 bgcolor=#C2E0FF
| 558093 ||  || — || November 23, 2014 || Haleakala || Pan-STARRS || centaurcritical || align=right | 70 km || 
|-id=094 bgcolor=#C7FF8F
| 558094 ||  || — || December 23, 2013 || Haleakala || Pan-STARRS || centaur || align=right | 32 km || 
|-id=095 bgcolor=#C2E0FF
| 558095 ||  || — || December 26, 2013 || Haleakala || Pan-STARRS || res2:5critical || align=right | 164 km || 
|-id=096 bgcolor=#d6d6d6
| 558096 ||  || — || November 22, 2014 || Haleakala || Pan-STARRS ||  || align=right | 1.7 km || 
|-id=097 bgcolor=#d6d6d6
| 558097 ||  || — || November 23, 2014 || Haleakala || Pan-STARRS || Tj (2.91) || align=right | 3.5 km || 
|-id=098 bgcolor=#E9E9E9
| 558098 ||  || — || August 30, 2005 || Palomar || NEAT ||  || align=right | 1.2 km || 
|-id=099 bgcolor=#d6d6d6
| 558099 ||  || — || November 18, 2014 || Haleakala || Pan-STARRS ||  || align=right | 2.3 km || 
|-id=100 bgcolor=#d6d6d6
| 558100 ||  || — || February 6, 1999 || Mauna Kea || C. Veillet, J. Anderson ||  || align=right | 2.4 km || 
|}

558101–558200 

|-bgcolor=#d6d6d6
| 558101 ||  || — || November 27, 2014 || Catalina || CSS || Tj (2.98) || align=right | 2.5 km || 
|-id=102 bgcolor=#d6d6d6
| 558102 ||  || — || November 17, 2014 || Haleakala || Pan-STARRS ||  || align=right | 2.3 km || 
|-id=103 bgcolor=#d6d6d6
| 558103 ||  || — || January 18, 2016 || Haleakala || Pan-STARRS ||  || align=right | 2.8 km || 
|-id=104 bgcolor=#C2FFFF
| 558104 ||  || — || November 27, 2014 || Haleakala || Pan-STARRS || L5 || align=right | 6.9 km || 
|-id=105 bgcolor=#d6d6d6
| 558105 ||  || — || November 28, 2014 || Haleakala || Pan-STARRS ||  || align=right | 2.1 km || 
|-id=106 bgcolor=#d6d6d6
| 558106 ||  || — || November 22, 2014 || Haleakala || Pan-STARRS ||  || align=right | 2.4 km || 
|-id=107 bgcolor=#d6d6d6
| 558107 ||  || — || November 29, 2014 || Mount Lemmon || Mount Lemmon Survey ||  || align=right | 2.0 km || 
|-id=108 bgcolor=#E9E9E9
| 558108 ||  || — || November 29, 2014 || Mount Lemmon || Mount Lemmon Survey ||  || align=right | 1.8 km || 
|-id=109 bgcolor=#E9E9E9
| 558109 ||  || — || February 5, 2011 || Haleakala || Pan-STARRS ||  || align=right | 1.3 km || 
|-id=110 bgcolor=#E9E9E9
| 558110 ||  || — || November 19, 2014 || Haleakala || Pan-STARRS ||  || align=right | 1.6 km || 
|-id=111 bgcolor=#E9E9E9
| 558111 ||  || — || November 27, 2014 || Haleakala || Pan-STARRS ||  || align=right | 1.5 km || 
|-id=112 bgcolor=#d6d6d6
| 558112 ||  || — || November 26, 2014 || Haleakala || Pan-STARRS ||  || align=right | 2.2 km || 
|-id=113 bgcolor=#E9E9E9
| 558113 ||  || — || November 24, 2014 || Haleakala || Pan-STARRS ||  || align=right | 1.2 km || 
|-id=114 bgcolor=#E9E9E9
| 558114 ||  || — || November 29, 2014 || Mount Lemmon || Mount Lemmon Survey ||  || align=right | 1.6 km || 
|-id=115 bgcolor=#E9E9E9
| 558115 ||  || — || November 28, 2014 || Haleakala || Pan-STARRS ||  || align=right | 1.4 km || 
|-id=116 bgcolor=#d6d6d6
| 558116 ||  || — || November 20, 2014 || Haleakala || Pan-STARRS ||  || align=right | 1.6 km || 
|-id=117 bgcolor=#E9E9E9
| 558117 ||  || — || November 27, 2014 || Haleakala || Pan-STARRS ||  || align=right | 2.0 km || 
|-id=118 bgcolor=#d6d6d6
| 558118 ||  || — || November 26, 2014 || Haleakala || Pan-STARRS ||  || align=right | 2.5 km || 
|-id=119 bgcolor=#E9E9E9
| 558119 ||  || — || November 16, 2014 || Mount Lemmon || Mount Lemmon Survey ||  || align=right | 2.0 km || 
|-id=120 bgcolor=#d6d6d6
| 558120 ||  || — || November 17, 2014 || Haleakala || Pan-STARRS ||  || align=right | 1.8 km || 
|-id=121 bgcolor=#C2FFFF
| 558121 ||  || — || November 22, 2014 || Haleakala || Pan-STARRS || L5 || align=right | 8.3 km || 
|-id=122 bgcolor=#E9E9E9
| 558122 ||  || — || November 21, 2014 || Haleakala || Pan-STARRS ||  || align=right | 1.6 km || 
|-id=123 bgcolor=#d6d6d6
| 558123 ||  || — || November 21, 2014 || Haleakala || Pan-STARRS ||  || align=right | 2.4 km || 
|-id=124 bgcolor=#d6d6d6
| 558124 ||  || — || October 28, 2014 || Mount Lemmon || Mount Lemmon Survey ||  || align=right | 2.2 km || 
|-id=125 bgcolor=#E9E9E9
| 558125 ||  || — || October 18, 2014 || Nogales || M. Schwartz, P. R. Holvorcem ||  || align=right | 1.6 km || 
|-id=126 bgcolor=#d6d6d6
| 558126 ||  || — || October 21, 2003 || Kitt Peak || Spacewatch ||  || align=right | 2.3 km || 
|-id=127 bgcolor=#E9E9E9
| 558127 ||  || — || September 20, 2009 || Kitt Peak || Spacewatch ||  || align=right | 2.2 km || 
|-id=128 bgcolor=#fefefe
| 558128 ||  || — || September 30, 2008 || Catalina || CSS || H || align=right data-sort-value="0.70" | 700 m || 
|-id=129 bgcolor=#d6d6d6
| 558129 ||  || — || September 3, 2002 || Palomar || NEAT ||  || align=right | 2.7 km || 
|-id=130 bgcolor=#fefefe
| 558130 ||  || — || December 17, 2001 || Socorro || LINEAR || H || align=right data-sort-value="0.65" | 650 m || 
|-id=131 bgcolor=#d6d6d6
| 558131 ||  || — || January 22, 2006 || Mount Lemmon || Mount Lemmon Survey ||  || align=right | 1.8 km || 
|-id=132 bgcolor=#E9E9E9
| 558132 ||  || — || April 22, 1998 || Kitt Peak || Spacewatch ||  || align=right | 2.8 km || 
|-id=133 bgcolor=#E9E9E9
| 558133 ||  || — || November 26, 2014 || Haleakala || Pan-STARRS ||  || align=right | 1.7 km || 
|-id=134 bgcolor=#E9E9E9
| 558134 ||  || — || October 10, 2004 || Kitt Peak || Spacewatch ||  || align=right | 1.6 km || 
|-id=135 bgcolor=#E9E9E9
| 558135 ||  || — || November 10, 2010 || Kitt Peak || Spacewatch ||  || align=right data-sort-value="0.93" | 930 m || 
|-id=136 bgcolor=#d6d6d6
| 558136 ||  || — || November 19, 2014 || Mount Lemmon || Mount Lemmon Survey ||  || align=right | 2.9 km || 
|-id=137 bgcolor=#d6d6d6
| 558137 ||  || — || November 19, 2014 || Mount Lemmon || Mount Lemmon Survey ||  || align=right | 3.0 km || 
|-id=138 bgcolor=#E9E9E9
| 558138 ||  || — || October 24, 2014 || Mount Lemmon || Mount Lemmon Survey ||  || align=right | 2.1 km || 
|-id=139 bgcolor=#E9E9E9
| 558139 ||  || — || January 10, 2011 || Mount Lemmon || Mount Lemmon Survey ||  || align=right | 1.4 km || 
|-id=140 bgcolor=#fefefe
| 558140 ||  || — || November 19, 2001 || Anderson Mesa || LONEOS || H || align=right data-sort-value="0.53" | 530 m || 
|-id=141 bgcolor=#E9E9E9
| 558141 ||  || — || October 25, 2014 || Haleakala || Pan-STARRS ||  || align=right | 1.4 km || 
|-id=142 bgcolor=#E9E9E9
| 558142 ||  || — || April 16, 2013 || Haleakala || Pan-STARRS ||  || align=right | 1.2 km || 
|-id=143 bgcolor=#E9E9E9
| 558143 ||  || — || October 26, 2001 || Palomar || NEAT ||  || align=right | 1.4 km || 
|-id=144 bgcolor=#E9E9E9
| 558144 ||  || — || August 5, 2005 || Palomar || NEAT ||  || align=right | 1.2 km || 
|-id=145 bgcolor=#E9E9E9
| 558145 ||  || — || December 14, 2010 || Mount Lemmon || Mount Lemmon Survey ||  || align=right | 1.4 km || 
|-id=146 bgcolor=#d6d6d6
| 558146 ||  || — || October 12, 2009 || Mount Lemmon || Mount Lemmon Survey ||  || align=right | 1.9 km || 
|-id=147 bgcolor=#E9E9E9
| 558147 ||  || — || November 27, 2006 || Mount Lemmon || Mount Lemmon Survey ||  || align=right | 1.1 km || 
|-id=148 bgcolor=#d6d6d6
| 558148 ||  || — || November 22, 2014 || Haleakala || Pan-STARRS ||  || align=right | 2.7 km || 
|-id=149 bgcolor=#E9E9E9
| 558149 ||  || — || July 14, 2013 || Haleakala || Pan-STARRS ||  || align=right | 1.7 km || 
|-id=150 bgcolor=#E9E9E9
| 558150 ||  || — || November 22, 2014 || Mount Lemmon || Mount Lemmon Survey ||  || align=right | 1.4 km || 
|-id=151 bgcolor=#d6d6d6
| 558151 ||  || — || May 11, 2000 || Kitt Peak || Spacewatch ||  || align=right | 2.8 km || 
|-id=152 bgcolor=#d6d6d6
| 558152 ||  || — || September 22, 2008 || Kitt Peak || Spacewatch ||  || align=right | 2.2 km || 
|-id=153 bgcolor=#E9E9E9
| 558153 ||  || — || May 27, 2003 || Kitt Peak || Spacewatch ||  || align=right | 2.4 km || 
|-id=154 bgcolor=#d6d6d6
| 558154 ||  || — || April 22, 2007 || Bergisch Gladbach || W. Bickel ||  || align=right | 3.1 km || 
|-id=155 bgcolor=#fefefe
| 558155 ||  || — || December 13, 2014 || Haleakala || Pan-STARRS || H || align=right data-sort-value="0.71" | 710 m || 
|-id=156 bgcolor=#E9E9E9
| 558156 ||  || — || September 15, 2009 || Kitt Peak || Spacewatch ||  || align=right | 1.5 km || 
|-id=157 bgcolor=#E9E9E9
| 558157 ||  || — || November 16, 2014 || Mount Lemmon || Mount Lemmon Survey ||  || align=right | 1.5 km || 
|-id=158 bgcolor=#d6d6d6
| 558158 ||  || — || November 17, 2014 || Haleakala || Pan-STARRS ||  || align=right | 1.8 km || 
|-id=159 bgcolor=#E9E9E9
| 558159 ||  || — || November 17, 2014 || Haleakala || Pan-STARRS ||  || align=right | 1.8 km || 
|-id=160 bgcolor=#d6d6d6
| 558160 ||  || — || January 27, 2004 || Kitt Peak || Spacewatch ||  || align=right | 3.4 km || 
|-id=161 bgcolor=#d6d6d6
| 558161 ||  || — || October 3, 2013 || Mayhill-ISON || L. Elenin ||  || align=right | 2.9 km || 
|-id=162 bgcolor=#d6d6d6
| 558162 ||  || — || November 24, 2003 || Socorro || LINEAR ||  || align=right | 2.3 km || 
|-id=163 bgcolor=#E9E9E9
| 558163 ||  || — || November 30, 2014 || Mount Lemmon || Mount Lemmon Survey ||  || align=right | 2.4 km || 
|-id=164 bgcolor=#fefefe
| 558164 ||  || — || March 19, 2004 || Siding Spring || SSS ||  || align=right | 1.0 km || 
|-id=165 bgcolor=#E9E9E9
| 558165 ||  || — || July 10, 2001 || Palomar || NEAT ||  || align=right | 1.4 km || 
|-id=166 bgcolor=#E9E9E9
| 558166 ||  || — || November 28, 2014 || Haleakala || Pan-STARRS ||  || align=right | 1.4 km || 
|-id=167 bgcolor=#C2FFFF
| 558167 ||  || — || October 3, 2013 || Haleakala || Pan-STARRS || L5 || align=right | 7.5 km || 
|-id=168 bgcolor=#C2E0FF
| 558168 ||  || — || December 10, 2014 || Cerro Tololo-DECam || Pan-STARRS || centaurcritical || align=right | 72 km || 
|-id=169 bgcolor=#d6d6d6
| 558169 ||  || — || November 9, 2013 || Mount Lemmon || Mount Lemmon Survey ||  || align=right | 2.9 km || 
|-id=170 bgcolor=#d6d6d6
| 558170 ||  || — || March 3, 2005 || Kitt Peak || Spacewatch ||  || align=right | 2.3 km || 
|-id=171 bgcolor=#C2FFFF
| 558171 ||  || — || December 11, 2014 || Mount Lemmon || Mount Lemmon Survey || L5 || align=right | 8.9 km || 
|-id=172 bgcolor=#d6d6d6
| 558172 ||  || — || December 15, 2014 || Mount Lemmon || Mount Lemmon Survey ||  || align=right | 1.8 km || 
|-id=173 bgcolor=#d6d6d6
| 558173 ||  || — || December 10, 2014 || Mount Lemmon || Mount Lemmon Survey ||  || align=right | 2.0 km || 
|-id=174 bgcolor=#C2FFFF
| 558174 ||  || — || December 1, 2014 || Haleakala || Pan-STARRS || L5 || align=right | 8.3 km || 
|-id=175 bgcolor=#C2FFFF
| 558175 ||  || — || December 12, 2014 || Haleakala || Pan-STARRS || L5 || align=right | 6.9 km || 
|-id=176 bgcolor=#d6d6d6
| 558176 ||  || — || December 11, 2014 || Mount Lemmon || Mount Lemmon Survey ||  || align=right | 2.5 km || 
|-id=177 bgcolor=#fefefe
| 558177 ||  || — || October 21, 2011 || Piszkesteto || K. Sárneczky || H || align=right data-sort-value="0.94" | 940 m || 
|-id=178 bgcolor=#fefefe
| 558178 ||  || — || May 20, 2005 || Mount Lemmon || Mount Lemmon Survey || H || align=right data-sort-value="0.66" | 660 m || 
|-id=179 bgcolor=#d6d6d6
| 558179 ||  || — || December 16, 2014 || Haleakala || Pan-STARRS ||  || align=right | 2.1 km || 
|-id=180 bgcolor=#d6d6d6
| 558180 ||  || — || October 23, 2003 || Kitt Peak || Spacewatch ||  || align=right | 2.3 km || 
|-id=181 bgcolor=#d6d6d6
| 558181 ||  || — || November 9, 2008 || Mount Lemmon || Mount Lemmon Survey ||  || align=right | 2.7 km || 
|-id=182 bgcolor=#d6d6d6
| 558182 ||  || — || September 3, 2002 || Palomar || NEAT ||  || align=right | 3.3 km || 
|-id=183 bgcolor=#d6d6d6
| 558183 ||  || — || January 28, 2004 || Kitt Peak || Spacewatch ||  || align=right | 1.9 km || 
|-id=184 bgcolor=#d6d6d6
| 558184 ||  || — || December 31, 2008 || Mount Lemmon || Mount Lemmon Survey ||  || align=right | 2.9 km || 
|-id=185 bgcolor=#d6d6d6
| 558185 ||  || — || April 30, 2011 || Catalina || Spacewatch ||  || align=right | 3.4 km || 
|-id=186 bgcolor=#d6d6d6
| 558186 ||  || — || October 23, 2003 || Kitt Peak || Spacewatch ||  || align=right | 1.9 km || 
|-id=187 bgcolor=#d6d6d6
| 558187 ||  || — || October 31, 2013 || Piszkesteto || K. Sárneczky ||  || align=right | 3.5 km || 
|-id=188 bgcolor=#d6d6d6
| 558188 ||  || — || January 17, 2004 || Kitt Peak || Spacewatch ||  || align=right | 3.4 km || 
|-id=189 bgcolor=#d6d6d6
| 558189 ||  || — || December 20, 2014 || Kitt Peak || Spacewatch ||  || align=right | 2.4 km || 
|-id=190 bgcolor=#E9E9E9
| 558190 ||  || — || November 21, 2014 || Mount Lemmon || Mount Lemmon Survey ||  || align=right | 1.7 km || 
|-id=191 bgcolor=#d6d6d6
| 558191 ||  || — || July 14, 2013 || Haleakala || Pan-STARRS ||  || align=right | 1.6 km || 
|-id=192 bgcolor=#d6d6d6
| 558192 ||  || — || September 24, 2008 || Kitt Peak || Spacewatch ||  || align=right | 2.3 km || 
|-id=193 bgcolor=#d6d6d6
| 558193 ||  || — || December 20, 2014 || Haleakala || Pan-STARRS ||  || align=right | 2.9 km || 
|-id=194 bgcolor=#d6d6d6
| 558194 ||  || — || November 3, 2008 || Mount Lemmon || Mount Lemmon Survey ||  || align=right | 3.4 km || 
|-id=195 bgcolor=#d6d6d6
| 558195 ||  || — || September 28, 2013 || Piszkesteto || K. Sárneczky ||  || align=right | 3.6 km || 
|-id=196 bgcolor=#d6d6d6
| 558196 ||  || — || November 17, 2014 || Haleakala || Pan-STARRS ||  || align=right | 3.2 km || 
|-id=197 bgcolor=#E9E9E9
| 558197 ||  || — || July 1, 2013 || Haleakala || Pan-STARRS ||  || align=right | 1.7 km || 
|-id=198 bgcolor=#d6d6d6
| 558198 ||  || — || December 17, 2003 || Kitt Peak || Spacewatch ||  || align=right | 3.2 km || 
|-id=199 bgcolor=#d6d6d6
| 558199 ||  || — || November 27, 2014 || Haleakala || Pan-STARRS ||  || align=right | 2.4 km || 
|-id=200 bgcolor=#d6d6d6
| 558200 ||  || — || September 23, 2008 || Kitt Peak || Spacewatch ||  || align=right | 2.0 km || 
|}

558201–558300 

|-bgcolor=#d6d6d6
| 558201 ||  || — || November 19, 2014 || Mount Lemmon || Mount Lemmon Survey ||  || align=right | 3.0 km || 
|-id=202 bgcolor=#d6d6d6
| 558202 ||  || — || September 1, 2013 || Haleakala || Pan-STARRS ||  || align=right | 1.8 km || 
|-id=203 bgcolor=#d6d6d6
| 558203 ||  || — || October 4, 2013 || Mount Lemmon || Mount Lemmon Survey ||  || align=right | 3.0 km || 
|-id=204 bgcolor=#E9E9E9
| 558204 ||  || — || October 23, 2009 || Kitt Peak || Spacewatch ||  || align=right | 1.7 km || 
|-id=205 bgcolor=#E9E9E9
| 558205 ||  || — || March 4, 2011 || Mount Lemmon || Mount Lemmon Survey ||  || align=right | 1.8 km || 
|-id=206 bgcolor=#d6d6d6
| 558206 ||  || — || February 25, 2006 || Mount Lemmon || Mount Lemmon Survey ||  || align=right | 2.1 km || 
|-id=207 bgcolor=#d6d6d6
| 558207 ||  || — || November 6, 2008 || Kitt Peak || Spacewatch ||  || align=right | 3.0 km || 
|-id=208 bgcolor=#d6d6d6
| 558208 ||  || — || November 26, 2014 || Haleakala || Pan-STARRS ||  || align=right | 2.0 km || 
|-id=209 bgcolor=#d6d6d6
| 558209 ||  || — || November 6, 2008 || Kitt Peak || Spacewatch ||  || align=right | 2.4 km || 
|-id=210 bgcolor=#d6d6d6
| 558210 ||  || — || February 13, 2010 || Catalina || CSS ||  || align=right | 2.3 km || 
|-id=211 bgcolor=#d6d6d6
| 558211 ||  || — || April 6, 2011 || Mount Lemmon || Mount Lemmon Survey ||  || align=right | 3.3 km || 
|-id=212 bgcolor=#E9E9E9
| 558212 ||  || — || October 24, 2014 || Mount Lemmon || Mount Lemmon Survey ||  || align=right | 2.0 km || 
|-id=213 bgcolor=#d6d6d6
| 558213 ||  || — || December 31, 2008 || Catalina || CSS ||  || align=right | 3.2 km || 
|-id=214 bgcolor=#d6d6d6
| 558214 ||  || — || August 11, 2012 || Tarleton State Uni || M. Hibbs ||  || align=right | 4.0 km || 
|-id=215 bgcolor=#fefefe
| 558215 ||  || — || November 20, 2014 || Haleakala || Pan-STARRS || H || align=right data-sort-value="0.77" | 770 m || 
|-id=216 bgcolor=#fefefe
| 558216 ||  || — || July 30, 2008 || Crni Vrh || J. Skvarč || H || align=right data-sort-value="0.97" | 970 m || 
|-id=217 bgcolor=#E9E9E9
| 558217 ||  || — || December 10, 2001 || Kitt Peak || Spacewatch ||  || align=right | 2.1 km || 
|-id=218 bgcolor=#fefefe
| 558218 ||  || — || November 24, 2011 || Palomar || PTF || H || align=right data-sort-value="0.85" | 850 m || 
|-id=219 bgcolor=#d6d6d6
| 558219 ||  || — || March 14, 2010 || Kitt Peak || Spacewatch ||  || align=right | 2.0 km || 
|-id=220 bgcolor=#d6d6d6
| 558220 ||  || — || February 19, 2010 || Kitt Peak || Spacewatch ||  || align=right | 2.3 km || 
|-id=221 bgcolor=#E9E9E9
| 558221 ||  || — || October 26, 2014 || Mount Lemmon || Mount Lemmon Survey ||  || align=right | 1.1 km || 
|-id=222 bgcolor=#d6d6d6
| 558222 ||  || — || January 21, 2015 || Haleakala || Pan-STARRS ||  || align=right | 3.0 km || 
|-id=223 bgcolor=#fefefe
| 558223 ||  || — || December 17, 2009 || Kitt Peak || Spacewatch || H || align=right data-sort-value="0.59" | 590 m || 
|-id=224 bgcolor=#C2E0FF
| 558224 ||  || — || December 29, 2014 || Haleakala || Pan-STARRS || other TNOcritical || align=right | 221 km || 
|-id=225 bgcolor=#fefefe
| 558225 ||  || — || December 20, 2014 || Haleakala || Pan-STARRS || H || align=right data-sort-value="0.54" | 540 m || 
|-id=226 bgcolor=#d6d6d6
| 558226 ||  || — || December 29, 2014 || Haleakala || Pan-STARRS ||  || align=right | 2.6 km || 
|-id=227 bgcolor=#d6d6d6
| 558227 ||  || — || November 2, 2008 || Catalina || CSS ||  || align=right | 2.7 km || 
|-id=228 bgcolor=#d6d6d6
| 558228 ||  || — || October 23, 2013 || Haleakala || Pan-STARRS ||  || align=right | 2.2 km || 
|-id=229 bgcolor=#d6d6d6
| 558229 ||  || — || January 7, 2010 || Kitt Peak || Spacewatch ||  || align=right | 2.6 km || 
|-id=230 bgcolor=#d6d6d6
| 558230 ||  || — || November 19, 2008 || Kitt Peak || Spacewatch ||  || align=right | 3.0 km || 
|-id=231 bgcolor=#d6d6d6
| 558231 ||  || — || August 21, 2012 || Kitt Peak || Pan-STARRS ||  || align=right | 2.9 km || 
|-id=232 bgcolor=#d6d6d6
| 558232 ||  || — || May 30, 2012 || Mount Lemmon || Mount Lemmon Survey ||  || align=right | 2.8 km || 
|-id=233 bgcolor=#d6d6d6
| 558233 ||  || — || October 5, 2013 || Mount Lemmon || Mount Lemmon Survey ||  || align=right | 1.6 km || 
|-id=234 bgcolor=#d6d6d6
| 558234 ||  || — || December 21, 2014 || Haleakala || Pan-STARRS ||  || align=right | 2.8 km || 
|-id=235 bgcolor=#d6d6d6
| 558235 ||  || — || December 26, 2014 || Haleakala || Pan-STARRS ||  || align=right | 1.9 km || 
|-id=236 bgcolor=#d6d6d6
| 558236 ||  || — || January 31, 2004 || Kitt Peak || SDSS || Tj (2.98) || align=right | 3.4 km || 
|-id=237 bgcolor=#d6d6d6
| 558237 ||  || — || September 15, 2013 || Mount Lemmon || Mount Lemmon Survey || Tj (2.99) || align=right | 2.8 km || 
|-id=238 bgcolor=#d6d6d6
| 558238 ||  || — || August 10, 2007 || Kitt Peak || Spacewatch ||  || align=right | 2.5 km || 
|-id=239 bgcolor=#d6d6d6
| 558239 ||  || — || December 29, 2014 || Haleakala || Pan-STARRS ||  || align=right | 2.3 km || 
|-id=240 bgcolor=#fefefe
| 558240 ||  || — || December 20, 2014 || Haleakala || Pan-STARRS || H || align=right data-sort-value="0.77" | 770 m || 
|-id=241 bgcolor=#d6d6d6
| 558241 ||  || — || August 7, 2018 || Haleakala || Pan-STARRS ||  || align=right | 2.1 km || 
|-id=242 bgcolor=#d6d6d6
| 558242 ||  || — || December 29, 2014 || Haleakala || Pan-STARRS || Tj (2.99) || align=right | 2.6 km || 
|-id=243 bgcolor=#d6d6d6
| 558243 ||  || — || December 30, 2014 || Haleakala || Pan-STARRS ||  || align=right | 1.9 km || 
|-id=244 bgcolor=#d6d6d6
| 558244 ||  || — || December 29, 2014 || Haleakala || Pan-STARRS ||  || align=right | 2.2 km || 
|-id=245 bgcolor=#d6d6d6
| 558245 ||  || — || January 13, 2016 || Haleakala || Pan-STARRS ||  || align=right | 2.4 km || 
|-id=246 bgcolor=#d6d6d6
| 558246 ||  || — || December 21, 2014 || Mount Lemmon || Mount Lemmon Survey ||  || align=right | 2.9 km || 
|-id=247 bgcolor=#E9E9E9
| 558247 ||  || — || February 5, 2011 || Haleakala || Pan-STARRS ||  || align=right | 1.8 km || 
|-id=248 bgcolor=#d6d6d6
| 558248 ||  || — || December 20, 2014 || Haleakala || Pan-STARRS ||  || align=right | 2.1 km || 
|-id=249 bgcolor=#d6d6d6
| 558249 ||  || — || December 26, 2014 || Haleakala || Pan-STARRS ||  || align=right | 2.2 km || 
|-id=250 bgcolor=#d6d6d6
| 558250 ||  || — || December 20, 2014 || Kitt Peak || Spacewatch ||  || align=right | 2.2 km || 
|-id=251 bgcolor=#fefefe
| 558251 ||  || — || December 29, 2014 || Haleakala || Pan-STARRS ||  || align=right data-sort-value="0.73" | 730 m || 
|-id=252 bgcolor=#d6d6d6
| 558252 ||  || — || December 21, 2014 || Haleakala || Pan-STARRS ||  || align=right | 2.1 km || 
|-id=253 bgcolor=#d6d6d6
| 558253 ||  || — || December 26, 2014 || Haleakala || Pan-STARRS ||  || align=right | 2.8 km || 
|-id=254 bgcolor=#E9E9E9
| 558254 ||  || — || March 4, 2012 || Catalina || CSS ||  || align=right | 3.4 km || 
|-id=255 bgcolor=#E9E9E9
| 558255 ||  || — || November 10, 2014 || Haleakala || Pan-STARRS ||  || align=right | 1.5 km || 
|-id=256 bgcolor=#d6d6d6
| 558256 ||  || — || March 9, 2005 || Mount Lemmon || Mount Lemmon Survey ||  || align=right | 3.1 km || 
|-id=257 bgcolor=#E9E9E9
| 558257 ||  || — || March 29, 2012 || Haleakala || Pan-STARRS ||  || align=right | 1.5 km || 
|-id=258 bgcolor=#E9E9E9
| 558258 ||  || — || October 2, 2014 || Haleakala || Pan-STARRS ||  || align=right | 1.2 km || 
|-id=259 bgcolor=#E9E9E9
| 558259 ||  || — || April 20, 2009 || Kitt Peak || Spacewatch ||  || align=right | 1.1 km || 
|-id=260 bgcolor=#E9E9E9
| 558260 ||  || — || October 2, 2014 || Haleakala || Pan-STARRS ||  || align=right data-sort-value="0.91" | 910 m || 
|-id=261 bgcolor=#C2FFFF
| 558261 ||  || — || November 21, 2014 || Haleakala || Pan-STARRS || L5 || align=right | 7.5 km || 
|-id=262 bgcolor=#E9E9E9
| 558262 ||  || — || September 4, 2014 || Haleakala || Pan-STARRS ||  || align=right data-sort-value="0.90" | 900 m || 
|-id=263 bgcolor=#d6d6d6
| 558263 ||  || — || February 18, 2010 || Mount Lemmon || Mount Lemmon Survey ||  || align=right | 2.2 km || 
|-id=264 bgcolor=#d6d6d6
| 558264 ||  || — || December 2, 2008 || Kitt Peak || Spacewatch ||  || align=right | 2.2 km || 
|-id=265 bgcolor=#d6d6d6
| 558265 ||  || — || April 5, 2011 || Kitt Peak || Spacewatch ||  || align=right | 3.1 km || 
|-id=266 bgcolor=#d6d6d6
| 558266 ||  || — || December 27, 2014 || Haleakala || Pan-STARRS ||  || align=right | 2.3 km || 
|-id=267 bgcolor=#d6d6d6
| 558267 ||  || — || October 25, 2008 || Kitt Peak || Spacewatch ||  || align=right | 2.5 km || 
|-id=268 bgcolor=#d6d6d6
| 558268 ||  || — || November 21, 2014 || Haleakala || Pan-STARRS || Tj (2.97) || align=right | 3.9 km || 
|-id=269 bgcolor=#d6d6d6
| 558269 ||  || — || November 8, 2008 || Kitt Peak || Spacewatch ||  || align=right | 2.2 km || 
|-id=270 bgcolor=#d6d6d6
| 558270 ||  || — || September 28, 2008 || Mount Lemmon || Mount Lemmon Survey ||  || align=right | 2.0 km || 
|-id=271 bgcolor=#d6d6d6
| 558271 ||  || — || September 3, 2013 || Mount Lemmon || Mount Lemmon Survey ||  || align=right | 2.3 km || 
|-id=272 bgcolor=#d6d6d6
| 558272 ||  || — || November 20, 2008 || Kitt Peak || Spacewatch ||  || align=right | 2.5 km || 
|-id=273 bgcolor=#E9E9E9
| 558273 ||  || — || November 1, 2014 || Mount Lemmon || Mount Lemmon Survey ||  || align=right | 2.5 km || 
|-id=274 bgcolor=#d6d6d6
| 558274 ||  || — || September 14, 2013 || Haleakala || Pan-STARRS ||  || align=right | 2.1 km || 
|-id=275 bgcolor=#d6d6d6
| 558275 ||  || — || January 29, 2011 || Kitt Peak || Spacewatch ||  || align=right | 2.6 km || 
|-id=276 bgcolor=#d6d6d6
| 558276 ||  || — || January 7, 2010 || Mount Lemmon || Mount Lemmon Survey ||  || align=right | 2.6 km || 
|-id=277 bgcolor=#E9E9E9
| 558277 ||  || — || December 22, 2005 || Kitt Peak || Spacewatch ||  || align=right | 1.6 km || 
|-id=278 bgcolor=#E9E9E9
| 558278 ||  || — || February 22, 2007 || Kitt Peak || Spacewatch ||  || align=right | 1.3 km || 
|-id=279 bgcolor=#E9E9E9
| 558279 ||  || — || January 10, 2002 || Campo Imperatore || A. Boattini, F. Bernardi ||  || align=right | 1.3 km || 
|-id=280 bgcolor=#E9E9E9
| 558280 ||  || — || September 5, 2013 || Haleakala || Pan-STARRS ||  || align=right | 1.8 km || 
|-id=281 bgcolor=#d6d6d6
| 558281 ||  || — || May 24, 2011 || Mount Lemmon || Mount Lemmon Survey ||  || align=right | 2.6 km || 
|-id=282 bgcolor=#E9E9E9
| 558282 ||  || — || July 29, 2009 || Kitt Peak || Spacewatch ||  || align=right | 1.1 km || 
|-id=283 bgcolor=#d6d6d6
| 558283 ||  || — || September 1, 2013 || Mount Lemmon || Mount Lemmon Survey ||  || align=right | 2.9 km || 
|-id=284 bgcolor=#d6d6d6
| 558284 ||  || — || October 23, 2013 || Haleakala || Pan-STARRS ||  || align=right | 2.7 km || 
|-id=285 bgcolor=#E9E9E9
| 558285 ||  || — || January 23, 2006 || Kitt Peak || Spacewatch ||  || align=right | 2.0 km || 
|-id=286 bgcolor=#E9E9E9
| 558286 ||  || — || November 23, 2009 || Kitt Peak || Spacewatch ||  || align=right | 1.9 km || 
|-id=287 bgcolor=#d6d6d6
| 558287 ||  || — || June 21, 2007 || Mount Lemmon || Mount Lemmon Survey ||  || align=right | 3.3 km || 
|-id=288 bgcolor=#d6d6d6
| 558288 ||  || — || January 13, 2015 || Haleakala || Pan-STARRS ||  || align=right | 2.8 km || 
|-id=289 bgcolor=#E9E9E9
| 558289 ||  || — || October 10, 2008 || Mount Lemmon || Mount Lemmon Survey ||  || align=right | 2.4 km || 
|-id=290 bgcolor=#d6d6d6
| 558290 ||  || — || September 3, 2008 || Kitt Peak || Spacewatch ||  || align=right | 1.9 km || 
|-id=291 bgcolor=#d6d6d6
| 558291 ||  || — || February 9, 2010 || Mount Lemmon || Mount Lemmon Survey ||  || align=right | 2.5 km || 
|-id=292 bgcolor=#d6d6d6
| 558292 ||  || — || March 29, 2011 || Mount Lemmon || Mount Lemmon Survey ||  || align=right | 1.9 km || 
|-id=293 bgcolor=#d6d6d6
| 558293 ||  || — || September 4, 2008 || Kitt Peak || Spacewatch ||  || align=right | 1.5 km || 
|-id=294 bgcolor=#d6d6d6
| 558294 ||  || — || March 13, 2010 || Mount Lemmon || Mount Lemmon Survey ||  || align=right | 1.9 km || 
|-id=295 bgcolor=#d6d6d6
| 558295 ||  || — || December 21, 2014 || Haleakala || Pan-STARRS ||  || align=right | 3.1 km || 
|-id=296 bgcolor=#d6d6d6
| 558296 ||  || — || September 26, 2003 || Apache Point || SDSS Collaboration ||  || align=right | 1.9 km || 
|-id=297 bgcolor=#d6d6d6
| 558297 ||  || — || January 10, 2010 || Kitt Peak || Spacewatch ||  || align=right | 2.4 km || 
|-id=298 bgcolor=#d6d6d6
| 558298 ||  || — || October 8, 2008 || Kitt Peak || Spacewatch ||  || align=right | 2.0 km || 
|-id=299 bgcolor=#E9E9E9
| 558299 ||  || — || October 13, 2013 || Mount Lemmon || Mount Lemmon Survey ||  || align=right | 1.9 km || 
|-id=300 bgcolor=#d6d6d6
| 558300 ||  || — || November 21, 2003 || Kitt Peak || Spacewatch ||  || align=right | 1.8 km || 
|}

558301–558400 

|-bgcolor=#E9E9E9
| 558301 ||  || — || June 1, 2008 || Mount Lemmon || Mount Lemmon Survey ||  || align=right | 1.7 km || 
|-id=302 bgcolor=#d6d6d6
| 558302 ||  || — || December 21, 2014 || Haleakala || Pan-STARRS ||  || align=right | 2.7 km || 
|-id=303 bgcolor=#d6d6d6
| 558303 ||  || — || September 26, 2003 || Apache Point || SDSS Collaboration ||  || align=right | 2.6 km || 
|-id=304 bgcolor=#d6d6d6
| 558304 ||  || — || October 2, 2008 || Mount Lemmon || Mount Lemmon Survey ||  || align=right | 1.8 km || 
|-id=305 bgcolor=#d6d6d6
| 558305 ||  || — || September 26, 2003 || Apache Point || SDSS Collaboration ||  || align=right | 2.1 km || 
|-id=306 bgcolor=#d6d6d6
| 558306 ||  || — || October 22, 2003 || Haleakala || AMOS ||  || align=right | 2.3 km || 
|-id=307 bgcolor=#FFC2E0
| 558307 ||  || — || January 15, 2015 || Haleakala || Pan-STARRS || AMO +1km || align=right | 1.1 km || 
|-id=308 bgcolor=#E9E9E9
| 558308 ||  || — || September 10, 2004 || Kitt Peak || Spacewatch ||  || align=right | 2.1 km || 
|-id=309 bgcolor=#d6d6d6
| 558309 ||  || — || October 1, 2008 || Mount Lemmon || Mount Lemmon Survey ||  || align=right | 2.3 km || 
|-id=310 bgcolor=#C2FFFF
| 558310 ||  || — || May 16, 2009 || Mount Lemmon || Mount Lemmon Survey || L5 || align=right | 9.0 km || 
|-id=311 bgcolor=#d6d6d6
| 558311 ||  || — || October 31, 2014 || Haleakala || Pan-STARRS ||  || align=right | 2.5 km || 
|-id=312 bgcolor=#d6d6d6
| 558312 ||  || — || December 15, 2014 || Haleakala || Pan-STARRS ||  || align=right | 2.9 km || 
|-id=313 bgcolor=#E9E9E9
| 558313 ||  || — || July 14, 2013 || Haleakala || Pan-STARRS ||  || align=right | 1.5 km || 
|-id=314 bgcolor=#d6d6d6
| 558314 ||  || — || October 22, 2003 || Apache Point || SDSS Collaboration ||  || align=right | 2.1 km || 
|-id=315 bgcolor=#E9E9E9
| 558315 ||  || — || August 27, 2013 || Haleakala || Pan-STARRS ||  || align=right | 1.3 km || 
|-id=316 bgcolor=#E9E9E9
| 558316 ||  || — || March 6, 2011 || Mount Lemmon || Mount Lemmon Survey ||  || align=right | 1.7 km || 
|-id=317 bgcolor=#E9E9E9
| 558317 ||  || — || January 23, 2006 || Mount Lemmon || Mount Lemmon Survey ||  || align=right | 1.7 km || 
|-id=318 bgcolor=#E9E9E9
| 558318 ||  || — || January 13, 2015 || Haleakala || Pan-STARRS ||  || align=right | 2.0 km || 
|-id=319 bgcolor=#fefefe
| 558319 ||  || — || February 12, 2008 || Mount Lemmon || Mount Lemmon Survey ||  || align=right data-sort-value="0.76" | 760 m || 
|-id=320 bgcolor=#d6d6d6
| 558320 ||  || — || October 1, 2008 || Mount Lemmon || Mount Lemmon Survey ||  || align=right | 2.5 km || 
|-id=321 bgcolor=#E9E9E9
| 558321 ||  || — || May 12, 2007 || Mount Lemmon || Mount Lemmon Survey ||  || align=right | 2.0 km || 
|-id=322 bgcolor=#d6d6d6
| 558322 ||  || — || December 1, 2003 || Kitt Peak || Spacewatch ||  || align=right | 2.8 km || 
|-id=323 bgcolor=#E9E9E9
| 558323 ||  || — || August 29, 2013 || Haleakala || Pan-STARRS ||  || align=right | 1.5 km || 
|-id=324 bgcolor=#E9E9E9
| 558324 ||  || — || March 6, 2011 || Mount Lemmon || Mount Lemmon Survey ||  || align=right | 1.9 km || 
|-id=325 bgcolor=#E9E9E9
| 558325 ||  || — || January 13, 2015 || Haleakala || Pan-STARRS ||  || align=right | 1.7 km || 
|-id=326 bgcolor=#d6d6d6
| 558326 ||  || — || January 13, 2015 || Haleakala || Pan-STARRS ||  || align=right | 2.1 km || 
|-id=327 bgcolor=#d6d6d6
| 558327 ||  || — || October 25, 2003 || Kitt Peak || Spacewatch ||  || align=right | 2.9 km || 
|-id=328 bgcolor=#d6d6d6
| 558328 ||  || — || January 13, 2015 || Haleakala || Pan-STARRS ||  || align=right | 2.7 km || 
|-id=329 bgcolor=#d6d6d6
| 558329 ||  || — || January 13, 2015 || Haleakala || Pan-STARRS ||  || align=right | 2.3 km || 
|-id=330 bgcolor=#d6d6d6
| 558330 ||  || — || October 19, 1998 || Kitt Peak || Spacewatch ||  || align=right | 2.4 km || 
|-id=331 bgcolor=#E9E9E9
| 558331 ||  || — || October 24, 2005 || Mauna Kea || Mauna Kea Obs. ||  || align=right | 2.0 km || 
|-id=332 bgcolor=#d6d6d6
| 558332 ||  || — || October 12, 2013 || Mount Lemmon || Mount Lemmon Survey ||  || align=right | 1.8 km || 
|-id=333 bgcolor=#d6d6d6
| 558333 ||  || — || January 10, 2015 || Palomar || PTF ||  || align=right | 2.9 km || 
|-id=334 bgcolor=#d6d6d6
| 558334 ||  || — || October 21, 2008 || Kitt Peak || Spacewatch ||  || align=right | 2.4 km || 
|-id=335 bgcolor=#d6d6d6
| 558335 ||  || — || September 14, 2013 || Haleakala || Pan-STARRS ||  || align=right | 2.5 km || 
|-id=336 bgcolor=#E9E9E9
| 558336 ||  || — || May 21, 2012 || Haleakala || Pan-STARRS ||  || align=right | 2.2 km || 
|-id=337 bgcolor=#d6d6d6
| 558337 ||  || — || October 1, 2003 || Kitt Peak || Spacewatch ||  || align=right | 2.5 km || 
|-id=338 bgcolor=#d6d6d6
| 558338 ||  || — || November 27, 2009 || Mount Lemmon || Mount Lemmon Survey ||  || align=right | 3.6 km || 
|-id=339 bgcolor=#E9E9E9
| 558339 ||  || — || December 1, 2005 || Kitt Peak || L. H. Wasserman, R. Millis ||  || align=right | 1.7 km || 
|-id=340 bgcolor=#d6d6d6
| 558340 ||  || — || January 13, 2015 || Haleakala || Pan-STARRS ||  || align=right | 1.9 km || 
|-id=341 bgcolor=#d6d6d6
| 558341 ||  || — || May 7, 2006 || Kitt Peak || Spacewatch ||  || align=right | 2.9 km || 
|-id=342 bgcolor=#E9E9E9
| 558342 ||  || — || October 1, 2013 || Mount Lemmon || Mount Lemmon Survey ||  || align=right | 1.5 km || 
|-id=343 bgcolor=#d6d6d6
| 558343 ||  || — || October 20, 2008 || Kitt Peak || Spacewatch ||  || align=right | 2.3 km || 
|-id=344 bgcolor=#d6d6d6
| 558344 ||  || — || September 1, 2013 || Mount Lemmon || Mount Lemmon Survey ||  || align=right | 2.8 km || 
|-id=345 bgcolor=#d6d6d6
| 558345 ||  || — || February 16, 2010 || Kitt Peak || Spacewatch ||  || align=right | 1.9 km || 
|-id=346 bgcolor=#d6d6d6
| 558346 ||  || — || October 2, 2008 || Kitt Peak || Spacewatch ||  || align=right | 2.0 km || 
|-id=347 bgcolor=#E9E9E9
| 558347 ||  || — || September 14, 2013 || Haleakala || Pan-STARRS ||  || align=right | 1.5 km || 
|-id=348 bgcolor=#d6d6d6
| 558348 ||  || — || January 13, 2015 || Haleakala || Pan-STARRS ||  || align=right | 1.6 km || 
|-id=349 bgcolor=#d6d6d6
| 558349 ||  || — || August 10, 2002 || Cerro Tololo || M. W. Buie, S. D. Kern ||  || align=right | 2.7 km || 
|-id=350 bgcolor=#d6d6d6
| 558350 ||  || — || April 30, 2011 || Mount Lemmon || Mount Lemmon Survey ||  || align=right | 1.7 km || 
|-id=351 bgcolor=#d6d6d6
| 558351 ||  || — || March 30, 2011 || Piszkesteto || Z. Kuli, K. Sárneczky ||  || align=right | 2.4 km || 
|-id=352 bgcolor=#d6d6d6
| 558352 ||  || — || November 3, 2008 || Mount Lemmon || Mount Lemmon Survey ||  || align=right | 2.6 km || 
|-id=353 bgcolor=#d6d6d6
| 558353 ||  || — || October 5, 2013 || Mount Lemmon || Mount Lemmon Survey ||  || align=right | 2.1 km || 
|-id=354 bgcolor=#d6d6d6
| 558354 ||  || — || January 6, 2010 || Kitt Peak || Spacewatch ||  || align=right | 3.7 km || 
|-id=355 bgcolor=#d6d6d6
| 558355 ||  || — || September 6, 2013 || Kitt Peak || Spacewatch ||  || align=right | 1.7 km || 
|-id=356 bgcolor=#E9E9E9
| 558356 ||  || — || January 13, 2015 || Haleakala || Pan-STARRS ||  || align=right | 2.2 km || 
|-id=357 bgcolor=#d6d6d6
| 558357 ||  || — || January 13, 2015 || Haleakala || Pan-STARRS ||  || align=right | 2.4 km || 
|-id=358 bgcolor=#d6d6d6
| 558358 ||  || — || November 6, 2008 || Mount Lemmon || Mount Lemmon Survey ||  || align=right | 3.0 km || 
|-id=359 bgcolor=#d6d6d6
| 558359 ||  || — || November 8, 2008 || Mount Lemmon || Mount Lemmon Survey ||  || align=right | 1.9 km || 
|-id=360 bgcolor=#d6d6d6
| 558360 ||  || — || October 6, 2008 || Mount Lemmon || Mount Lemmon Survey ||  || align=right | 2.7 km || 
|-id=361 bgcolor=#d6d6d6
| 558361 ||  || — || October 3, 2008 || Mount Lemmon || Mount Lemmon Survey ||  || align=right | 1.8 km || 
|-id=362 bgcolor=#E9E9E9
| 558362 ||  || — || October 4, 2013 || Mount Lemmon || Mount Lemmon Survey ||  || align=right | 1.7 km || 
|-id=363 bgcolor=#d6d6d6
| 558363 ||  || — || March 11, 2005 || Mount Lemmon || Mount Lemmon Survey ||  || align=right | 3.8 km || 
|-id=364 bgcolor=#C2FFFF
| 558364 ||  || — || January 14, 2015 || Haleakala || Pan-STARRS || L5 || align=right | 7.2 km || 
|-id=365 bgcolor=#E9E9E9
| 558365 ||  || — || January 10, 2007 || Mount Lemmon || Mount Lemmon Survey ||  || align=right | 1.7 km || 
|-id=366 bgcolor=#d6d6d6
| 558366 ||  || — || November 26, 2003 || Kitt Peak || Spacewatch ||  || align=right | 2.8 km || 
|-id=367 bgcolor=#d6d6d6
| 558367 ||  || — || September 19, 2003 || Kitt Peak || Spacewatch ||  || align=right | 1.8 km || 
|-id=368 bgcolor=#E9E9E9
| 558368 ||  || — || August 25, 2003 || Cerro Tololo || Cerro Tololo Obs. ||  || align=right | 1.7 km || 
|-id=369 bgcolor=#d6d6d6
| 558369 ||  || — || November 4, 2013 || Mount Lemmon || Mount Lemmon Survey ||  || align=right | 2.1 km || 
|-id=370 bgcolor=#d6d6d6
| 558370 ||  || — || May 6, 2011 || Mount Lemmon || Mount Lemmon Survey ||  || align=right | 1.9 km || 
|-id=371 bgcolor=#d6d6d6
| 558371 ||  || — || April 6, 2011 || Mount Lemmon || Mount Lemmon Survey ||  || align=right | 1.7 km || 
|-id=372 bgcolor=#d6d6d6
| 558372 ||  || — || May 22, 2012 || Mount Lemmon || Mount Lemmon Survey ||  || align=right | 2.2 km || 
|-id=373 bgcolor=#d6d6d6
| 558373 ||  || — || October 2, 2013 || Mount Lemmon || Mount Lemmon Survey ||  || align=right | 1.9 km || 
|-id=374 bgcolor=#d6d6d6
| 558374 ||  || — || December 21, 2014 || Haleakala || Pan-STARRS ||  || align=right | 2.0 km || 
|-id=375 bgcolor=#E9E9E9
| 558375 ||  || — || December 21, 2014 || Mount Lemmon || Mount Lemmon Survey ||  || align=right | 1.6 km || 
|-id=376 bgcolor=#d6d6d6
| 558376 ||  || — || September 28, 2003 || Kitt Peak || Spacewatch ||  || align=right | 1.6 km || 
|-id=377 bgcolor=#d6d6d6
| 558377 ||  || — || December 20, 2009 || Mount Lemmon || Mount Lemmon Survey ||  || align=right | 1.9 km || 
|-id=378 bgcolor=#d6d6d6
| 558378 ||  || — || October 4, 2013 || Kitt Peak || Spacewatch ||  || align=right | 2.2 km || 
|-id=379 bgcolor=#d6d6d6
| 558379 ||  || — || December 21, 2014 || Haleakala || Pan-STARRS ||  || align=right | 2.1 km || 
|-id=380 bgcolor=#d6d6d6
| 558380 ||  || — || December 21, 2014 || Haleakala || Pan-STARRS ||  || align=right | 1.9 km || 
|-id=381 bgcolor=#d6d6d6
| 558381 ||  || — || October 28, 2008 || Mount Lemmon || Mount Lemmon Survey ||  || align=right | 1.6 km || 
|-id=382 bgcolor=#E9E9E9
| 558382 ||  || — || December 21, 2014 || Haleakala || Pan-STARRS ||  || align=right | 1.6 km || 
|-id=383 bgcolor=#E9E9E9
| 558383 ||  || — || October 8, 2004 || Kitt Peak || Spacewatch ||  || align=right | 1.5 km || 
|-id=384 bgcolor=#d6d6d6
| 558384 ||  || — || September 10, 2008 || Kitt Peak || Spacewatch ||  || align=right | 1.9 km || 
|-id=385 bgcolor=#d6d6d6
| 558385 ||  || — || March 15, 2010 || Mount Lemmon || Mount Lemmon Survey ||  || align=right | 2.0 km || 
|-id=386 bgcolor=#d6d6d6
| 558386 ||  || — || March 10, 1999 || Kitt Peak || Spacewatch ||  || align=right | 2.8 km || 
|-id=387 bgcolor=#E9E9E9
| 558387 ||  || — || September 5, 2008 || Kitt Peak || Spacewatch ||  || align=right | 1.9 km || 
|-id=388 bgcolor=#d6d6d6
| 558388 ||  || — || September 12, 2013 || Catalina || CSS ||  || align=right | 2.5 km || 
|-id=389 bgcolor=#E9E9E9
| 558389 ||  || — || December 21, 2014 || Haleakala || Pan-STARRS ||  || align=right | 1.9 km || 
|-id=390 bgcolor=#d6d6d6
| 558390 ||  || — || February 13, 2010 || Mount Lemmon || Mount Lemmon Survey ||  || align=right | 1.9 km || 
|-id=391 bgcolor=#d6d6d6
| 558391 ||  || — || January 14, 2015 || Mount Lemmon || Pan-STARRS ||  || align=right | 2.2 km || 
|-id=392 bgcolor=#d6d6d6
| 558392 ||  || — || December 21, 2014 || Haleakala || Pan-STARRS ||  || align=right | 3.1 km || 
|-id=393 bgcolor=#d6d6d6
| 558393 ||  || — || October 22, 2003 || Apache Point || SDSS Collaboration ||  || align=right | 2.8 km || 
|-id=394 bgcolor=#d6d6d6
| 558394 ||  || — || January 23, 1999 || Kitt Peak || Spacewatch ||  || align=right | 2.5 km || 
|-id=395 bgcolor=#E9E9E9
| 558395 ||  || — || September 13, 2013 || Mount Lemmon || Mount Lemmon Survey ||  || align=right | 1.7 km || 
|-id=396 bgcolor=#E9E9E9
| 558396 ||  || — || November 18, 2009 || Kitt Peak || Spacewatch ||  || align=right | 1.6 km || 
|-id=397 bgcolor=#E9E9E9
| 558397 ||  || — || October 1, 2013 || Mount Lemmon || Mount Lemmon Survey ||  || align=right | 1.7 km || 
|-id=398 bgcolor=#d6d6d6
| 558398 ||  || — || August 31, 2013 || Piszkesteto || K. Sárneczky ||  || align=right | 2.1 km || 
|-id=399 bgcolor=#d6d6d6
| 558399 ||  || — || September 3, 2008 || Kitt Peak || Spacewatch ||  || align=right | 2.1 km || 
|-id=400 bgcolor=#d6d6d6
| 558400 ||  || — || April 29, 2011 || Mount Lemmon || Mount Lemmon Survey ||  || align=right | 1.7 km || 
|}

558401–558500 

|-bgcolor=#d6d6d6
| 558401 ||  || — || September 14, 2013 || Haleakala || Pan-STARRS ||  || align=right | 1.7 km || 
|-id=402 bgcolor=#d6d6d6
| 558402 ||  || — || September 7, 2008 || Mount Lemmon || Mount Lemmon Survey ||  || align=right | 1.8 km || 
|-id=403 bgcolor=#d6d6d6
| 558403 ||  || — || September 3, 2013 || Calar Alto || F. Hormuth ||  || align=right | 1.7 km || 
|-id=404 bgcolor=#d6d6d6
| 558404 ||  || — || November 7, 2008 || Mount Lemmon || Mount Lemmon Survey ||  || align=right | 2.3 km || 
|-id=405 bgcolor=#d6d6d6
| 558405 ||  || — || December 4, 2008 || Kitt Peak || Spacewatch || THM || align=right | 1.7 km || 
|-id=406 bgcolor=#d6d6d6
| 558406 ||  || — || September 15, 2013 || Mount Lemmon || Mount Lemmon Survey ||  || align=right | 1.8 km || 
|-id=407 bgcolor=#d6d6d6
| 558407 ||  || — || October 13, 2013 || Mount Lemmon || Mount Lemmon Survey ||  || align=right | 1.7 km || 
|-id=408 bgcolor=#d6d6d6
| 558408 ||  || — || December 14, 1998 || Kitt Peak || Spacewatch ||  || align=right | 3.2 km || 
|-id=409 bgcolor=#d6d6d6
| 558409 ||  || — || March 11, 2005 || Kitt Peak || M. W. Buie, L. H. Wasserman ||  || align=right | 2.0 km || 
|-id=410 bgcolor=#d6d6d6
| 558410 ||  || — || December 21, 2014 || Haleakala || Pan-STARRS ||  || align=right | 2.2 km || 
|-id=411 bgcolor=#d6d6d6
| 558411 ||  || — || January 14, 2015 || Haleakala || Pan-STARRS ||  || align=right | 1.9 km || 
|-id=412 bgcolor=#d6d6d6
| 558412 ||  || — || October 4, 2013 || Mount Lemmon || Mount Lemmon Survey ||  || align=right | 1.7 km || 
|-id=413 bgcolor=#d6d6d6
| 558413 ||  || — || January 21, 2004 || Socorro || LINEAR ||  || align=right | 2.3 km || 
|-id=414 bgcolor=#E9E9E9
| 558414 ||  || — || September 11, 2004 || Kitt Peak || Spacewatch ||  || align=right | 1.4 km || 
|-id=415 bgcolor=#d6d6d6
| 558415 ||  || — || January 14, 2015 || Haleakala || Pan-STARRS ||  || align=right | 2.5 km || 
|-id=416 bgcolor=#d6d6d6
| 558416 ||  || — || May 13, 2005 || Mount Lemmon || Mount Lemmon Survey ||  || align=right | 2.0 km || 
|-id=417 bgcolor=#d6d6d6
| 558417 ||  || — || October 26, 2013 || Catalina || CSS || HYG || align=right | 3.1 km || 
|-id=418 bgcolor=#E9E9E9
| 558418 ||  || — || January 31, 2006 || Kitt Peak || Spacewatch ||  || align=right | 2.0 km || 
|-id=419 bgcolor=#d6d6d6
| 558419 ||  || — || November 4, 2013 || Haleakala || Pan-STARRS ||  || align=right | 2.4 km || 
|-id=420 bgcolor=#d6d6d6
| 558420 ||  || — || November 4, 1996 || Kitt Peak || Spacewatch ||  || align=right | 3.2 km || 
|-id=421 bgcolor=#d6d6d6
| 558421 ||  || — || December 21, 2014 || Haleakala || Pan-STARRS ||  || align=right | 1.9 km || 
|-id=422 bgcolor=#d6d6d6
| 558422 ||  || — || January 14, 2015 || Haleakala || Pan-STARRS ||  || align=right | 1.9 km || 
|-id=423 bgcolor=#d6d6d6
| 558423 ||  || — || October 29, 2008 || Mount Lemmon || Mount Lemmon Survey ||  || align=right | 1.9 km || 
|-id=424 bgcolor=#d6d6d6
| 558424 ||  || — || January 14, 2015 || Haleakala || Pan-STARRS ||  || align=right | 1.9 km || 
|-id=425 bgcolor=#d6d6d6
| 558425 ||  || — || February 15, 2010 || Mount Lemmon || Mount Lemmon Survey ||  || align=right | 2.8 km || 
|-id=426 bgcolor=#d6d6d6
| 558426 ||  || — || December 21, 2014 || Haleakala || Pan-STARRS ||  || align=right | 2.2 km || 
|-id=427 bgcolor=#d6d6d6
| 558427 ||  || — || September 26, 2003 || Apache Point || SDSS Collaboration ||  || align=right | 1.7 km || 
|-id=428 bgcolor=#d6d6d6
| 558428 ||  || — || September 12, 2013 || Catalina || CSS ||  || align=right | 4.1 km || 
|-id=429 bgcolor=#d6d6d6
| 558429 ||  || — || January 16, 2004 || Kitt Peak || Spacewatch ||  || align=right | 2.4 km || 
|-id=430 bgcolor=#d6d6d6
| 558430 ||  || — || September 10, 2013 || Haleakala || Pan-STARRS ||  || align=right | 2.2 km || 
|-id=431 bgcolor=#d6d6d6
| 558431 ||  || — || February 9, 2010 || Mount Lemmon || Mount Lemmon Survey ||  || align=right | 1.8 km || 
|-id=432 bgcolor=#d6d6d6
| 558432 ||  || — || May 1, 2011 || Haleakala || Pan-STARRS ||  || align=right | 2.5 km || 
|-id=433 bgcolor=#d6d6d6
| 558433 ||  || — || April 2, 2006 || Kitt Peak || Spacewatch ||  || align=right | 2.0 km || 
|-id=434 bgcolor=#d6d6d6
| 558434 ||  || — || December 21, 2014 || Haleakala || Pan-STARRS ||  || align=right | 2.7 km || 
|-id=435 bgcolor=#d6d6d6
| 558435 ||  || — || October 26, 2008 || Mount Lemmon || Mount Lemmon Survey ||  || align=right | 2.4 km || 
|-id=436 bgcolor=#d6d6d6
| 558436 ||  || — || December 21, 2014 || Haleakala || Pan-STARRS ||  || align=right | 2.3 km || 
|-id=437 bgcolor=#d6d6d6
| 558437 ||  || — || January 28, 2004 || Kitt Peak || Spacewatch ||  || align=right | 1.7 km || 
|-id=438 bgcolor=#d6d6d6
| 558438 ||  || — || January 14, 2015 || Haleakala || Pan-STARRS ||  || align=right | 2.3 km || 
|-id=439 bgcolor=#d6d6d6
| 558439 ||  || — || December 18, 2009 || Kitt Peak || Spacewatch ||  || align=right | 1.9 km || 
|-id=440 bgcolor=#d6d6d6
| 558440 ||  || — || November 17, 2008 || Kitt Peak || Spacewatch || THM || align=right | 1.8 km || 
|-id=441 bgcolor=#d6d6d6
| 558441 ||  || — || October 3, 2013 || Haleakala || Pan-STARRS ||  || align=right | 1.6 km || 
|-id=442 bgcolor=#E9E9E9
| 558442 ||  || — || November 21, 2009 || Kitt Peak || Spacewatch ||  || align=right | 2.3 km || 
|-id=443 bgcolor=#d6d6d6
| 558443 ||  || — || November 19, 2014 || Mount Lemmon || Mount Lemmon Survey ||  || align=right | 2.2 km || 
|-id=444 bgcolor=#d6d6d6
| 558444 ||  || — || May 5, 2011 || Mount Lemmon || Mount Lemmon Survey ||  || align=right | 2.9 km || 
|-id=445 bgcolor=#E9E9E9
| 558445 ||  || — || May 21, 2012 || Mount Lemmon || Mount Lemmon Survey ||  || align=right | 2.2 km || 
|-id=446 bgcolor=#E9E9E9
| 558446 ||  || — || October 23, 2009 || Kitt Peak || Spacewatch ||  || align=right | 1.7 km || 
|-id=447 bgcolor=#d6d6d6
| 558447 ||  || — || November 18, 2003 || Kitt Peak || Spacewatch ||  || align=right | 2.1 km || 
|-id=448 bgcolor=#d6d6d6
| 558448 ||  || — || July 23, 2011 || Siding Spring || SSS ||  || align=right | 3.4 km || 
|-id=449 bgcolor=#d6d6d6
| 558449 ||  || — || October 16, 2003 || Kitt Peak || Spacewatch ||  || align=right | 2.0 km || 
|-id=450 bgcolor=#d6d6d6
| 558450 ||  || — || October 4, 2013 || Catalina || CSS ||  || align=right | 2.7 km || 
|-id=451 bgcolor=#d6d6d6
| 558451 ||  || — || January 31, 2006 || Kitt Peak || Spacewatch ||  || align=right | 1.8 km || 
|-id=452 bgcolor=#d6d6d6
| 558452 ||  || — || September 28, 2008 || Mount Lemmon || Mount Lemmon Survey ||  || align=right | 2.8 km || 
|-id=453 bgcolor=#d6d6d6
| 558453 ||  || — || December 21, 2014 || Haleakala || Pan-STARRS ||  || align=right | 1.8 km || 
|-id=454 bgcolor=#E9E9E9
| 558454 ||  || — || September 29, 2005 || Siding Spring || SSS ||  || align=right | 1.5 km || 
|-id=455 bgcolor=#d6d6d6
| 558455 ||  || — || December 21, 2014 || Haleakala || Pan-STARRS ||  || align=right | 2.5 km || 
|-id=456 bgcolor=#E9E9E9
| 558456 ||  || — || September 22, 2014 || Haleakala || Pan-STARRS ||  || align=right | 1.2 km || 
|-id=457 bgcolor=#E9E9E9
| 558457 ||  || — || September 18, 2014 || Haleakala || Pan-STARRS ||  || align=right | 1.4 km || 
|-id=458 bgcolor=#fefefe
| 558458 ||  || — || February 1, 2012 || Catalina || CSS ||  || align=right data-sort-value="0.68" | 680 m || 
|-id=459 bgcolor=#d6d6d6
| 558459 ||  || — || November 23, 2014 || Haleakala || Pan-STARRS ||  || align=right | 2.8 km || 
|-id=460 bgcolor=#E9E9E9
| 558460 ||  || — || February 12, 2011 || Mount Lemmon || Mount Lemmon Survey ||  || align=right | 1.5 km || 
|-id=461 bgcolor=#E9E9E9
| 558461 ||  || — || January 13, 2011 || Mount Lemmon || Mount Lemmon Survey ||  || align=right | 1.7 km || 
|-id=462 bgcolor=#d6d6d6
| 558462 ||  || — || December 29, 2014 || Haleakala || Pan-STARRS ||  || align=right | 2.0 km || 
|-id=463 bgcolor=#E9E9E9
| 558463 ||  || — || March 6, 2008 || Mount Lemmon || Mount Lemmon Survey ||  || align=right | 1.1 km || 
|-id=464 bgcolor=#E9E9E9
| 558464 ||  || — || August 12, 2013 || Haleakala || Pan-STARRS ||  || align=right | 1.8 km || 
|-id=465 bgcolor=#d6d6d6
| 558465 ||  || — || January 12, 2010 || Kitt Peak || Spacewatch ||  || align=right | 2.5 km || 
|-id=466 bgcolor=#E9E9E9
| 558466 ||  || — || October 27, 1995 || Kitt Peak || Spacewatch ||  || align=right | 1.9 km || 
|-id=467 bgcolor=#E9E9E9
| 558467 ||  || — || January 15, 2015 || Haleakala || Pan-STARRS ||  || align=right | 1.5 km || 
|-id=468 bgcolor=#d6d6d6
| 558468 ||  || — || January 15, 2015 || Haleakala || Pan-STARRS ||  || align=right | 2.1 km || 
|-id=469 bgcolor=#d6d6d6
| 558469 ||  || — || August 26, 2012 || Mount Lemmon || Pan-STARRS ||  || align=right | 2.4 km || 
|-id=470 bgcolor=#d6d6d6
| 558470 ||  || — || October 24, 2013 || Mount Lemmon || Mount Lemmon Survey ||  || align=right | 2.5 km || 
|-id=471 bgcolor=#d6d6d6
| 558471 ||  || — || November 28, 2014 || Haleakala || Pan-STARRS ||  || align=right | 2.6 km || 
|-id=472 bgcolor=#d6d6d6
| 558472 ||  || — || October 3, 2013 || Mount Lemmon || Mount Lemmon Survey ||  || align=right | 3.0 km || 
|-id=473 bgcolor=#d6d6d6
| 558473 ||  || — || October 28, 2008 || Mount Lemmon || Mount Lemmon Survey ||  || align=right | 2.4 km || 
|-id=474 bgcolor=#d6d6d6
| 558474 ||  || — || October 28, 2013 || Kitt Peak || Spacewatch ||  || align=right | 2.3 km || 
|-id=475 bgcolor=#d6d6d6
| 558475 ||  || — || March 10, 2010 || Vail-Jarnac || Jarnac Obs. ||  || align=right | 4.2 km || 
|-id=476 bgcolor=#fefefe
| 558476 ||  || — || February 14, 2008 || Mount Lemmon || Mount Lemmon Survey ||  || align=right data-sort-value="0.65" | 650 m || 
|-id=477 bgcolor=#E9E9E9
| 558477 ||  || — || January 15, 2015 || Haleakala || Pan-STARRS ||  || align=right | 1.2 km || 
|-id=478 bgcolor=#fefefe
| 558478 ||  || — || August 15, 2013 || Haleakala || Pan-STARRS ||  || align=right data-sort-value="0.60" | 600 m || 
|-id=479 bgcolor=#d6d6d6
| 558479 ||  || — || April 30, 2012 || Mount Lemmon || Mount Lemmon Survey ||  || align=right | 2.2 km || 
|-id=480 bgcolor=#d6d6d6
| 558480 ||  || — || October 15, 2002 || Palomar || NEAT ||  || align=right | 3.3 km || 
|-id=481 bgcolor=#d6d6d6
| 558481 ||  || — || November 9, 2008 || Kitt Peak || Spacewatch ||  || align=right | 2.0 km || 
|-id=482 bgcolor=#d6d6d6
| 558482 ||  || — || September 6, 2008 || Mount Lemmon || Mount Lemmon Survey ||  || align=right | 2.1 km || 
|-id=483 bgcolor=#d6d6d6
| 558483 ||  || — || October 18, 2007 || Kitt Peak || Mount Lemmon Survey ||  || align=right | 3.1 km || 
|-id=484 bgcolor=#E9E9E9
| 558484 ||  || — || December 2, 2014 || Haleakala || Pan-STARRS ||  || align=right data-sort-value="0.95" | 950 m || 
|-id=485 bgcolor=#d6d6d6
| 558485 ||  || — || January 15, 2015 || Haleakala || Pan-STARRS ||  || align=right | 2.2 km || 
|-id=486 bgcolor=#d6d6d6
| 558486 ||  || — || March 13, 2010 || Mount Lemmon || Mount Lemmon Survey ||  || align=right | 2.7 km || 
|-id=487 bgcolor=#d6d6d6
| 558487 ||  || — || September 10, 2007 || Kitt Peak || Spacewatch ||  || align=right | 2.4 km || 
|-id=488 bgcolor=#d6d6d6
| 558488 ||  || — || January 15, 2015 || Haleakala || Pan-STARRS ||  || align=right | 2.1 km || 
|-id=489 bgcolor=#E9E9E9
| 558489 ||  || — || September 22, 2008 || Catalina || CSS ||  || align=right | 2.5 km || 
|-id=490 bgcolor=#d6d6d6
| 558490 ||  || — || November 7, 2008 || Mount Lemmon || Mount Lemmon Survey ||  || align=right | 2.1 km || 
|-id=491 bgcolor=#d6d6d6
| 558491 ||  || — || January 15, 2015 || Haleakala || Pan-STARRS ||  || align=right | 2.4 km || 
|-id=492 bgcolor=#d6d6d6
| 558492 ||  || — || November 11, 2013 || Kitt Peak || Spacewatch ||  || align=right | 2.1 km || 
|-id=493 bgcolor=#d6d6d6
| 558493 ||  || — || September 12, 2001 || Kitt Peak || Spacewatch ||  || align=right | 2.5 km || 
|-id=494 bgcolor=#d6d6d6
| 558494 ||  || — || September 24, 2012 || Mount Lemmon || Mount Lemmon Survey ||  || align=right | 2.3 km || 
|-id=495 bgcolor=#d6d6d6
| 558495 ||  || — || March 8, 2005 || Mount Lemmon || Mount Lemmon Survey ||  || align=right | 2.4 km || 
|-id=496 bgcolor=#d6d6d6
| 558496 ||  || — || November 6, 2013 || Haleakala || Pan-STARRS ||  || align=right | 2.6 km || 
|-id=497 bgcolor=#d6d6d6
| 558497 ||  || — || November 26, 2013 || Haleakala || Pan-STARRS ||  || align=right | 2.6 km || 
|-id=498 bgcolor=#d6d6d6
| 558498 ||  || — || April 6, 2011 || Mount Lemmon || Mount Lemmon Survey ||  || align=right | 2.5 km || 
|-id=499 bgcolor=#d6d6d6
| 558499 ||  || — || November 9, 2013 || Haleakala || Pan-STARRS ||  || align=right | 3.1 km || 
|-id=500 bgcolor=#d6d6d6
| 558500 ||  || — || March 21, 2004 || Kitt Peak || Spacewatch ||  || align=right | 4.0 km || 
|}

558501–558600 

|-bgcolor=#d6d6d6
| 558501 ||  || — || January 15, 2015 || Haleakala || Pan-STARRS ||  || align=right | 3.2 km || 
|-id=502 bgcolor=#d6d6d6
| 558502 ||  || — || December 22, 2008 || Mount Lemmon || Mount Lemmon Survey ||  || align=right | 2.1 km || 
|-id=503 bgcolor=#E9E9E9
| 558503 ||  || — || March 11, 2007 || Bergisch Gladbach || W. Bickel ||  || align=right | 1.0 km || 
|-id=504 bgcolor=#d6d6d6
| 558504 ||  || — || August 26, 2013 || Haleakala || Pan-STARRS ||  || align=right | 2.8 km || 
|-id=505 bgcolor=#d6d6d6
| 558505 ||  || — || March 1, 2011 || Mount Lemmon || Mount Lemmon Survey || KOR || align=right | 1.2 km || 
|-id=506 bgcolor=#d6d6d6
| 558506 ||  || — || March 13, 2011 || Kitt Peak || Spacewatch ||  || align=right | 1.9 km || 
|-id=507 bgcolor=#d6d6d6
| 558507 ||  || — || September 30, 2003 || Apache Point || SDSS Collaboration ||  || align=right | 2.5 km || 
|-id=508 bgcolor=#E9E9E9
| 558508 ||  || — || April 14, 2007 || Kitt Peak || Spacewatch ||  || align=right | 1.7 km || 
|-id=509 bgcolor=#d6d6d6
| 558509 ||  || — || January 13, 2015 || Haleakala || Pan-STARRS ||  || align=right | 2.5 km || 
|-id=510 bgcolor=#d6d6d6
| 558510 ||  || — || October 8, 2008 || Mount Lemmon || Mount Lemmon Survey ||  || align=right | 2.3 km || 
|-id=511 bgcolor=#d6d6d6
| 558511 ||  || — || September 22, 2008 || Mount Lemmon || Mount Lemmon Survey ||  || align=right | 2.1 km || 
|-id=512 bgcolor=#d6d6d6
| 558512 ||  || — || March 12, 2004 || Palomar || NEAT ||  || align=right | 3.3 km || 
|-id=513 bgcolor=#E9E9E9
| 558513 ||  || — || January 23, 2006 || Kitt Peak || Spacewatch ||  || align=right | 1.9 km || 
|-id=514 bgcolor=#C2FFFF
| 558514 ||  || — || October 26, 2014 || Haleakala || Pan-STARRS || L5 || align=right | 11 km || 
|-id=515 bgcolor=#E9E9E9
| 558515 ||  || — || January 12, 2011 || Kitt Peak || Spacewatch ||  || align=right | 2.1 km || 
|-id=516 bgcolor=#d6d6d6
| 558516 ||  || — || October 23, 2008 || Mount Lemmon || Mount Lemmon Survey ||  || align=right | 1.8 km || 
|-id=517 bgcolor=#d6d6d6
| 558517 ||  || — || February 14, 2010 || Mount Lemmon || Mount Lemmon Survey || EOS || align=right | 1.5 km || 
|-id=518 bgcolor=#d6d6d6
| 558518 ||  || — || December 29, 2014 || Haleakala || Pan-STARRS ||  || align=right | 2.8 km || 
|-id=519 bgcolor=#E9E9E9
| 558519 ||  || — || August 12, 2013 || Kitt Peak || Spacewatch ||  || align=right | 1.6 km || 
|-id=520 bgcolor=#d6d6d6
| 558520 ||  || — || September 3, 2013 || Haleakala || Pan-STARRS || TIR || align=right | 2.0 km || 
|-id=521 bgcolor=#d6d6d6
| 558521 ||  || — || January 15, 2015 || Haleakala || Pan-STARRS ||  || align=right | 2.1 km || 
|-id=522 bgcolor=#d6d6d6
| 558522 ||  || — || November 18, 2003 || Kitt Peak || Spacewatch ||  || align=right | 2.5 km || 
|-id=523 bgcolor=#d6d6d6
| 558523 ||  || — || September 12, 2007 || Kitt Peak || Spacewatch ||  || align=right | 2.2 km || 
|-id=524 bgcolor=#d6d6d6
| 558524 ||  || — || November 20, 2003 || Palomar || NEAT ||  || align=right | 2.6 km || 
|-id=525 bgcolor=#d6d6d6
| 558525 ||  || — || April 2, 2011 || Kitt Peak || Spacewatch ||  || align=right | 2.1 km || 
|-id=526 bgcolor=#d6d6d6
| 558526 ||  || — || October 12, 2007 || Mount Lemmon || Mount Lemmon Survey ||  || align=right | 3.2 km || 
|-id=527 bgcolor=#d6d6d6
| 558527 ||  || — || October 12, 2007 || Mount Lemmon || Mount Lemmon Survey ||  || align=right | 2.6 km || 
|-id=528 bgcolor=#d6d6d6
| 558528 ||  || — || January 1, 2009 || Mount Lemmon || Mount Lemmon Survey ||  || align=right | 2.8 km || 
|-id=529 bgcolor=#d6d6d6
| 558529 ||  || — || September 5, 2013 || Kitt Peak || Spacewatch ||  || align=right | 2.7 km || 
|-id=530 bgcolor=#d6d6d6
| 558530 ||  || — || September 26, 2012 || Mount Lemmon || Mount Lemmon Survey ||  || align=right | 2.5 km || 
|-id=531 bgcolor=#d6d6d6
| 558531 ||  || — || November 25, 2013 || XuYi || PMO NEO ||  || align=right | 2.9 km || 
|-id=532 bgcolor=#d6d6d6
| 558532 ||  || — || October 3, 2013 || Haleakala || Pan-STARRS ||  || align=right | 2.7 km || 
|-id=533 bgcolor=#d6d6d6
| 558533 ||  || — || October 22, 2013 || Catalina || CSS ||  || align=right | 3.2 km || 
|-id=534 bgcolor=#d6d6d6
| 558534 ||  || — || August 24, 2003 || Cerro Tololo || Cerro Tololo Obs. ||  || align=right | 2.1 km || 
|-id=535 bgcolor=#E9E9E9
| 558535 ||  || — || December 29, 2014 || Mount Lemmon || Mount Lemmon Survey || HOF || align=right | 2.2 km || 
|-id=536 bgcolor=#d6d6d6
| 558536 ||  || — || October 3, 2013 || Haleakala || Pan-STARRS || VER || align=right | 2.0 km || 
|-id=537 bgcolor=#d6d6d6
| 558537 ||  || — || January 14, 2015 || Haleakala || Pan-STARRS ||  || align=right | 2.0 km || 
|-id=538 bgcolor=#d6d6d6
| 558538 ||  || — || September 25, 2008 || Kitt Peak || Spacewatch ||  || align=right | 2.1 km || 
|-id=539 bgcolor=#d6d6d6
| 558539 ||  || — || September 12, 2007 || Mount Lemmon || Mount Lemmon Survey ||  || align=right | 2.5 km || 
|-id=540 bgcolor=#d6d6d6
| 558540 ||  || — || January 15, 2015 || Haleakala || Pan-STARRS ||  || align=right | 1.8 km || 
|-id=541 bgcolor=#d6d6d6
| 558541 ||  || — || February 16, 2004 || Kitt Peak || Spacewatch ||  || align=right | 3.7 km || 
|-id=542 bgcolor=#d6d6d6
| 558542 ||  || — || October 9, 2007 || Kitt Peak || Spacewatch ||  || align=right | 2.9 km || 
|-id=543 bgcolor=#fefefe
| 558543 ||  || — || November 2, 2011 || Kitt Peak || Spacewatch || H || align=right data-sort-value="0.62" | 620 m || 
|-id=544 bgcolor=#fefefe
| 558544 ||  || — || November 30, 2011 || Mount Lemmon || Mount Lemmon Survey || H || align=right data-sort-value="0.61" | 610 m || 
|-id=545 bgcolor=#fefefe
| 558545 ||  || — || January 12, 2015 || Haleakala || Pan-STARRS || H || align=right data-sort-value="0.60" | 600 m || 
|-id=546 bgcolor=#d6d6d6
| 558546 ||  || — || March 12, 2010 || Kitt Peak || Spacewatch ||  || align=right | 2.1 km || 
|-id=547 bgcolor=#d6d6d6
| 558547 ||  || — || November 9, 2008 || Mount Lemmon || Mount Lemmon Survey ||  || align=right | 1.9 km || 
|-id=548 bgcolor=#d6d6d6
| 558548 ||  || — || November 24, 2008 || Kitt Peak || Spacewatch ||  || align=right | 2.1 km || 
|-id=549 bgcolor=#d6d6d6
| 558549 ||  || — || February 18, 2010 || Kitt Peak || Spacewatch ||  || align=right | 1.8 km || 
|-id=550 bgcolor=#d6d6d6
| 558550 ||  || — || October 5, 2013 || Kitt Peak || Spacewatch ||  || align=right | 2.9 km || 
|-id=551 bgcolor=#E9E9E9
| 558551 ||  || — || November 30, 2014 || Haleakala || Pan-STARRS ||  || align=right | 1.0 km || 
|-id=552 bgcolor=#E9E9E9
| 558552 ||  || — || December 15, 2006 || Kitt Peak || Spacewatch ||  || align=right data-sort-value="0.93" | 930 m || 
|-id=553 bgcolor=#d6d6d6
| 558553 ||  || — || March 2, 2011 || Kitt Peak || Spacewatch ||  || align=right | 2.5 km || 
|-id=554 bgcolor=#d6d6d6
| 558554 ||  || — || May 26, 2006 || Mount Lemmon || Mount Lemmon Survey ||  || align=right | 3.1 km || 
|-id=555 bgcolor=#d6d6d6
| 558555 ||  || — || October 22, 2008 || Kitt Peak || Spacewatch ||  || align=right | 2.6 km || 
|-id=556 bgcolor=#d6d6d6
| 558556 ||  || — || July 18, 2013 || Haleakala || Pan-STARRS ||  || align=right | 3.2 km || 
|-id=557 bgcolor=#E9E9E9
| 558557 ||  || — || April 11, 2016 || Haleakala || Pan-STARRS ||  || align=right | 1.4 km || 
|-id=558 bgcolor=#d6d6d6
| 558558 ||  || — || September 22, 2003 || Kitt Peak || Spacewatch ||  || align=right | 1.9 km || 
|-id=559 bgcolor=#d6d6d6
| 558559 ||  || — || January 15, 2015 || Haleakala || Pan-STARRS ||  || align=right | 1.8 km || 
|-id=560 bgcolor=#d6d6d6
| 558560 ||  || — || January 14, 2015 || Haleakala || Pan-STARRS ||  || align=right | 2.5 km || 
|-id=561 bgcolor=#d6d6d6
| 558561 ||  || — || January 15, 2015 || Haleakala || Pan-STARRS ||  || align=right | 1.7 km || 
|-id=562 bgcolor=#d6d6d6
| 558562 ||  || — || January 13, 2015 || Haleakala || Pan-STARRS ||  || align=right | 2.7 km || 
|-id=563 bgcolor=#d6d6d6
| 558563 ||  || — || September 28, 2008 || Mount Lemmon || Mount Lemmon Survey ||  || align=right | 2.3 km || 
|-id=564 bgcolor=#d6d6d6
| 558564 ||  || — || February 10, 2010 || Kitt Peak || Spacewatch ||  || align=right | 2.5 km || 
|-id=565 bgcolor=#d6d6d6
| 558565 ||  || — || April 29, 2011 || Kitt Peak || Mount Lemmon Survey ||  || align=right | 3.9 km || 
|-id=566 bgcolor=#d6d6d6
| 558566 ||  || — || January 16, 2015 || Kitt Peak || Spacewatch ||  || align=right | 2.2 km || 
|-id=567 bgcolor=#d6d6d6
| 558567 ||  || — || January 16, 2015 || Kitt Peak || Spacewatch ||  || align=right | 2.7 km || 
|-id=568 bgcolor=#E9E9E9
| 558568 ||  || — || October 24, 2005 || Mauna Kea || Mauna Kea Obs. ||  || align=right | 3.3 km || 
|-id=569 bgcolor=#d6d6d6
| 558569 ||  || — || July 21, 2001 || Ondrejov || P. Pravec, L. Kotková ||  || align=right | 3.3 km || 
|-id=570 bgcolor=#d6d6d6
| 558570 ||  || — || September 13, 2007 || Mount Lemmon || Mount Lemmon Survey ||  || align=right | 2.3 km || 
|-id=571 bgcolor=#d6d6d6
| 558571 ||  || — || March 23, 2010 || ESA OGS || ESA OGS ||  || align=right | 2.5 km || 
|-id=572 bgcolor=#d6d6d6
| 558572 ||  || — || September 6, 2008 || Mount Lemmon || Mount Lemmon Survey ||  || align=right | 2.0 km || 
|-id=573 bgcolor=#E9E9E9
| 558573 ||  || — || February 1, 2006 || Kitt Peak || Spacewatch ||  || align=right | 1.9 km || 
|-id=574 bgcolor=#d6d6d6
| 558574 ||  || — || June 3, 2011 || Mount Lemmon || Mount Lemmon Survey ||  || align=right | 3.2 km || 
|-id=575 bgcolor=#d6d6d6
| 558575 ||  || — || December 22, 2003 || Kitt Peak || Spacewatch ||  || align=right | 2.6 km || 
|-id=576 bgcolor=#d6d6d6
| 558576 ||  || — || December 4, 2008 || Catalina || CSS ||  || align=right | 3.4 km || 
|-id=577 bgcolor=#d6d6d6
| 558577 ||  || — || November 8, 2008 || Mount Lemmon || Mount Lemmon Survey ||  || align=right | 2.4 km || 
|-id=578 bgcolor=#d6d6d6
| 558578 ||  || — || March 9, 2005 || Kitt Peak || Spacewatch ||  || align=right | 2.8 km || 
|-id=579 bgcolor=#E9E9E9
| 558579 ||  || — || April 27, 2012 || Haleakala || Pan-STARRS ||  || align=right | 1.7 km || 
|-id=580 bgcolor=#d6d6d6
| 558580 ||  || — || January 16, 2015 || Mount Lemmon || Mount Lemmon Survey ||  || align=right | 2.9 km || 
|-id=581 bgcolor=#d6d6d6
| 558581 ||  || — || March 13, 2011 || Mount Lemmon || Mount Lemmon Survey ||  || align=right | 3.1 km || 
|-id=582 bgcolor=#fefefe
| 558582 ||  || — || December 16, 2014 || Haleakala || Pan-STARRS ||  || align=right data-sort-value="0.69" | 690 m || 
|-id=583 bgcolor=#E9E9E9
| 558583 ||  || — || October 2, 2013 || Palomar || PTF ||  || align=right | 2.2 km || 
|-id=584 bgcolor=#d6d6d6
| 558584 ||  || — || January 16, 2015 || Mount Lemmon || Mount Lemmon Survey ||  || align=right | 2.4 km || 
|-id=585 bgcolor=#d6d6d6
| 558585 ||  || — || December 29, 2003 || Kitt Peak || Spacewatch ||  || align=right | 3.1 km || 
|-id=586 bgcolor=#d6d6d6
| 558586 ||  || — || October 3, 2013 || Mount Lemmon || Mount Lemmon Survey ||  || align=right | 1.9 km || 
|-id=587 bgcolor=#d6d6d6
| 558587 ||  || — || September 10, 2007 || Catalina || CSS ||  || align=right | 3.5 km || 
|-id=588 bgcolor=#d6d6d6
| 558588 ||  || — || November 30, 2014 || Haleakala || Pan-STARRS ||  || align=right | 3.6 km || 
|-id=589 bgcolor=#d6d6d6
| 558589 ||  || — || November 2, 2007 || Mount Lemmon || Mount Lemmon Survey ||  || align=right | 2.8 km || 
|-id=590 bgcolor=#d6d6d6
| 558590 ||  || — || September 12, 2007 || Mount Lemmon || Mount Lemmon Survey ||  || align=right | 3.0 km || 
|-id=591 bgcolor=#d6d6d6
| 558591 ||  || — || July 21, 2006 || Mount Lemmon || Mount Lemmon Survey ||  || align=right | 2.5 km || 
|-id=592 bgcolor=#d6d6d6
| 558592 ||  || — || December 29, 2008 || Mount Lemmon || Mount Lemmon Survey ||  || align=right | 2.7 km || 
|-id=593 bgcolor=#d6d6d6
| 558593 ||  || — || January 16, 2015 || Haleakala || Pan-STARRS ||  || align=right | 2.5 km || 
|-id=594 bgcolor=#d6d6d6
| 558594 ||  || — || November 1, 2008 || Mount Lemmon || Mount Lemmon Survey ||  || align=right | 2.9 km || 
|-id=595 bgcolor=#E9E9E9
| 558595 ||  || — || July 29, 2003 || Campo Imperatore || CINEOS ||  || align=right | 2.1 km || 
|-id=596 bgcolor=#d6d6d6
| 558596 ||  || — || January 16, 2015 || Haleakala || Pan-STARRS ||  || align=right | 2.5 km || 
|-id=597 bgcolor=#d6d6d6
| 558597 ||  || — || February 26, 2004 || Socorro || LINEAR ||  || align=right | 2.7 km || 
|-id=598 bgcolor=#d6d6d6
| 558598 ||  || — || November 27, 2013 || Haleakala || Pan-STARRS ||  || align=right | 2.3 km || 
|-id=599 bgcolor=#d6d6d6
| 558599 ||  || — || September 14, 2012 || Catalina || CSS ||  || align=right | 3.4 km || 
|-id=600 bgcolor=#E9E9E9
| 558600 ||  || — || January 16, 2015 || Haleakala || Pan-STARRS ||  || align=right | 2.0 km || 
|}

558601–558700 

|-bgcolor=#d6d6d6
| 558601 ||  || — || March 16, 2004 || Kitt Peak || Spacewatch ||  || align=right | 4.6 km || 
|-id=602 bgcolor=#d6d6d6
| 558602 ||  || — || August 29, 2006 || Kitt Peak || Spacewatch ||  || align=right | 3.2 km || 
|-id=603 bgcolor=#d6d6d6
| 558603 ||  || — || October 15, 2007 || Mount Lemmon || Mount Lemmon Survey ||  || align=right | 2.3 km || 
|-id=604 bgcolor=#d6d6d6
| 558604 ||  || — || February 13, 2010 || Mount Lemmon || Mount Lemmon Survey ||  || align=right | 2.5 km || 
|-id=605 bgcolor=#d6d6d6
| 558605 ||  || — || December 22, 2008 || Kitt Peak || Spacewatch ||  || align=right | 2.9 km || 
|-id=606 bgcolor=#d6d6d6
| 558606 ||  || — || September 13, 2007 || Mount Lemmon || Mount Lemmon Survey ||  || align=right | 2.1 km || 
|-id=607 bgcolor=#E9E9E9
| 558607 ||  || — || September 6, 2008 || Kitt Peak || Spacewatch ||  || align=right | 1.5 km || 
|-id=608 bgcolor=#d6d6d6
| 558608 ||  || — || November 11, 2013 || Mount Lemmon || Mount Lemmon Survey ||  || align=right | 2.6 km || 
|-id=609 bgcolor=#d6d6d6
| 558609 ||  || — || January 16, 2015 || Haleakala || Pan-STARRS ||  || align=right | 2.3 km || 
|-id=610 bgcolor=#d6d6d6
| 558610 ||  || — || May 22, 2011 || Mount Lemmon || Mount Lemmon Survey ||  || align=right | 2.7 km || 
|-id=611 bgcolor=#fefefe
| 558611 ||  || — || April 21, 2009 || Mount Lemmon || Mount Lemmon Survey ||  || align=right data-sort-value="0.58" | 580 m || 
|-id=612 bgcolor=#d6d6d6
| 558612 ||  || — || December 19, 2009 || Mount Lemmon || Mount Lemmon Survey ||  || align=right | 1.8 km || 
|-id=613 bgcolor=#d6d6d6
| 558613 ||  || — || September 14, 2013 || Haleakala || Pan-STARRS ||  || align=right | 2.3 km || 
|-id=614 bgcolor=#d6d6d6
| 558614 ||  || — || November 28, 2013 || Mount Lemmon || Mount Lemmon Survey ||  || align=right | 2.5 km || 
|-id=615 bgcolor=#d6d6d6
| 558615 ||  || — || January 16, 2009 || Kitt Peak || Spacewatch ||  || align=right | 3.1 km || 
|-id=616 bgcolor=#E9E9E9
| 558616 ||  || — || December 6, 2010 || Kitt Peak || Spacewatch ||  || align=right | 1.6 km || 
|-id=617 bgcolor=#d6d6d6
| 558617 ||  || — || May 21, 2006 || Kitt Peak || Spacewatch ||  || align=right | 3.0 km || 
|-id=618 bgcolor=#d6d6d6
| 558618 ||  || — || October 23, 2013 || Kitt Peak || Pan-STARRS ||  || align=right | 3.3 km || 
|-id=619 bgcolor=#d6d6d6
| 558619 ||  || — || March 4, 2005 || Mount Lemmon || Mount Lemmon Survey ||  || align=right | 2.6 km || 
|-id=620 bgcolor=#d6d6d6
| 558620 ||  || — || March 11, 2011 || Mount Lemmon || Mount Lemmon Survey ||  || align=right | 2.2 km || 
|-id=621 bgcolor=#d6d6d6
| 558621 ||  || — || December 5, 2008 || Mount Lemmon || Mount Lemmon Survey ||  || align=right | 3.5 km || 
|-id=622 bgcolor=#fefefe
| 558622 ||  || — || September 1, 2013 || Mount Lemmon || Mount Lemmon Survey ||  || align=right data-sort-value="0.58" | 580 m || 
|-id=623 bgcolor=#E9E9E9
| 558623 ||  || — || November 18, 2009 || Kitt Peak || Spacewatch ||  || align=right | 1.9 km || 
|-id=624 bgcolor=#d6d6d6
| 558624 ||  || — || September 10, 2007 || Kitt Peak || Spacewatch ||  || align=right | 2.5 km || 
|-id=625 bgcolor=#d6d6d6
| 558625 ||  || — || August 23, 2001 || Socorro || LINEAR ||  || align=right | 3.8 km || 
|-id=626 bgcolor=#d6d6d6
| 558626 ||  || — || February 11, 2004 || Kitt Peak || Spacewatch ||  || align=right | 2.5 km || 
|-id=627 bgcolor=#d6d6d6
| 558627 ||  || — || December 15, 2014 || Mount Lemmon || Mount Lemmon Survey ||  || align=right | 3.0 km || 
|-id=628 bgcolor=#E9E9E9
| 558628 ||  || — || December 12, 2014 || Mayhill-ISON || L. Elenin ||  || align=right | 1.3 km || 
|-id=629 bgcolor=#d6d6d6
| 558629 ||  || — || November 4, 2014 || Mount Lemmon || Mount Lemmon Survey ||  || align=right | 3.0 km || 
|-id=630 bgcolor=#E9E9E9
| 558630 ||  || — || November 16, 2009 || Mount Lemmon || Mount Lemmon Survey ||  || align=right | 1.8 km || 
|-id=631 bgcolor=#d6d6d6
| 558631 ||  || — || February 15, 2010 || Kitt Peak || Spacewatch ||  || align=right | 2.8 km || 
|-id=632 bgcolor=#E9E9E9
| 558632 ||  || — || October 26, 2009 || Kitt Peak || Spacewatch ||  || align=right | 1.7 km || 
|-id=633 bgcolor=#E9E9E9
| 558633 ||  || — || February 21, 2007 || Mount Lemmon || Mount Lemmon Survey ||  || align=right | 1.4 km || 
|-id=634 bgcolor=#E9E9E9
| 558634 ||  || — || September 16, 2009 || Kitt Peak || Spacewatch ||  || align=right | 1.7 km || 
|-id=635 bgcolor=#E9E9E9
| 558635 ||  || — || September 27, 2000 || Kitt Peak || Spacewatch ||  || align=right | 1.5 km || 
|-id=636 bgcolor=#d6d6d6
| 558636 ||  || — || January 17, 2015 || Haleakala || Pan-STARRS ||  || align=right | 2.5 km || 
|-id=637 bgcolor=#E9E9E9
| 558637 ||  || — || January 12, 2011 || Kitt Peak || Spacewatch ||  || align=right | 1.6 km || 
|-id=638 bgcolor=#d6d6d6
| 558638 ||  || — || January 17, 2015 || Haleakala || Pan-STARRS ||  || align=right | 2.5 km || 
|-id=639 bgcolor=#d6d6d6
| 558639 ||  || — || October 1, 2008 || Kitt Peak || Spacewatch ||  || align=right | 1.9 km || 
|-id=640 bgcolor=#d6d6d6
| 558640 ||  || — || January 17, 2015 || Haleakala || Pan-STARRS ||  || align=right | 2.3 km || 
|-id=641 bgcolor=#E9E9E9
| 558641 ||  || — || August 17, 2009 || Catalina || CSS ||  || align=right | 1.7 km || 
|-id=642 bgcolor=#E9E9E9
| 558642 ||  || — || September 1, 2005 || Anderson Mesa || LONEOS ||  || align=right | 1.4 km || 
|-id=643 bgcolor=#d6d6d6
| 558643 ||  || — || September 20, 2003 || Kitt Peak || Spacewatch ||  || align=right | 2.6 km || 
|-id=644 bgcolor=#d6d6d6
| 558644 ||  || — || June 8, 2012 || Mount Lemmon || Mount Lemmon Survey ||  || align=right | 3.0 km || 
|-id=645 bgcolor=#d6d6d6
| 558645 ||  || — || March 12, 2005 || Kitt Peak || Spacewatch ||  || align=right | 2.5 km || 
|-id=646 bgcolor=#E9E9E9
| 558646 ||  || — || September 28, 2009 || Mount Lemmon || Mount Lemmon Survey ||  || align=right | 2.2 km || 
|-id=647 bgcolor=#d6d6d6
| 558647 ||  || — || September 4, 2008 || Kitt Peak || Spacewatch ||  || align=right | 2.0 km || 
|-id=648 bgcolor=#d6d6d6
| 558648 ||  || — || April 8, 2006 || Kitt Peak || Spacewatch ||  || align=right | 1.8 km || 
|-id=649 bgcolor=#E9E9E9
| 558649 ||  || — || September 25, 2009 || Kitt Peak || Spacewatch ||  || align=right | 1.7 km || 
|-id=650 bgcolor=#d6d6d6
| 558650 ||  || — || January 23, 2004 || Socorro || LINEAR ||  || align=right | 4.8 km || 
|-id=651 bgcolor=#d6d6d6
| 558651 ||  || — || January 17, 2015 || Kitt Peak || Pan-STARRS ||  || align=right | 3.0 km || 
|-id=652 bgcolor=#d6d6d6
| 558652 ||  || — || November 8, 2008 || Mount Lemmon || Mount Lemmon Survey ||  || align=right | 2.4 km || 
|-id=653 bgcolor=#d6d6d6
| 558653 ||  || — || January 17, 2015 || Haleakala || Pan-STARRS ||  || align=right | 2.6 km || 
|-id=654 bgcolor=#d6d6d6
| 558654 ||  || — || January 17, 2015 || Haleakala || Pan-STARRS ||  || align=right | 2.1 km || 
|-id=655 bgcolor=#d6d6d6
| 558655 ||  || — || November 21, 2008 || Kitt Peak || Spacewatch ||  || align=right | 1.8 km || 
|-id=656 bgcolor=#d6d6d6
| 558656 ||  || — || October 26, 2008 || Mount Lemmon || Mount Lemmon Survey ||  || align=right | 3.0 km || 
|-id=657 bgcolor=#d6d6d6
| 558657 ||  || — || May 27, 2012 || Mount Lemmon || Mount Lemmon Survey ||  || align=right | 4.1 km || 
|-id=658 bgcolor=#d6d6d6
| 558658 ||  || — || April 6, 2011 || Mount Lemmon || Mount Lemmon Survey ||  || align=right | 2.6 km || 
|-id=659 bgcolor=#d6d6d6
| 558659 ||  || — || October 26, 2008 || Kitt Peak || Spacewatch ||  || align=right | 1.8 km || 
|-id=660 bgcolor=#E9E9E9
| 558660 ||  || — || October 3, 2004 || Palomar || NEAT ||  || align=right | 2.0 km || 
|-id=661 bgcolor=#d6d6d6
| 558661 ||  || — || January 2, 2009 || Mount Lemmon || Mount Lemmon Survey ||  || align=right | 2.2 km || 
|-id=662 bgcolor=#d6d6d6
| 558662 ||  || — || April 14, 2005 || Catalina || CSS ||  || align=right | 2.4 km || 
|-id=663 bgcolor=#d6d6d6
| 558663 ||  || — || January 17, 2015 || Haleakala || Pan-STARRS ||  || align=right | 2.0 km || 
|-id=664 bgcolor=#d6d6d6
| 558664 ||  || — || January 17, 2015 || Haleakala || Pan-STARRS ||  || align=right | 3.0 km || 
|-id=665 bgcolor=#d6d6d6
| 558665 ||  || — || January 17, 2015 || Haleakala || Pan-STARRS ||  || align=right | 2.5 km || 
|-id=666 bgcolor=#d6d6d6
| 558666 ||  || — || January 17, 2015 || Haleakala || Pan-STARRS ||  || align=right | 2.9 km || 
|-id=667 bgcolor=#d6d6d6
| 558667 ||  || — || December 22, 2008 || Kitt Peak || Spacewatch ||  || align=right | 2.7 km || 
|-id=668 bgcolor=#d6d6d6
| 558668 ||  || — || October 14, 2007 || Mount Lemmon || Mount Lemmon Survey ||  || align=right | 2.8 km || 
|-id=669 bgcolor=#d6d6d6
| 558669 ||  || — || November 27, 2013 || Haleakala || Pan-STARRS ||  || align=right | 2.6 km || 
|-id=670 bgcolor=#d6d6d6
| 558670 ||  || — || September 23, 2008 || Kitt Peak || Spacewatch ||  || align=right | 2.0 km || 
|-id=671 bgcolor=#d6d6d6
| 558671 ||  || — || April 6, 2005 || Mount Lemmon || Mount Lemmon Survey ||  || align=right | 2.5 km || 
|-id=672 bgcolor=#d6d6d6
| 558672 ||  || — || October 22, 2003 || Apache Point || SDSS Collaboration ||  || align=right | 1.7 km || 
|-id=673 bgcolor=#d6d6d6
| 558673 ||  || — || September 17, 2012 || Mount Lemmon || Mount Lemmon Survey ||  || align=right | 2.8 km || 
|-id=674 bgcolor=#d6d6d6
| 558674 ||  || — || November 1, 2008 || Mount Lemmon || Mount Lemmon Survey ||  || align=right | 2.3 km || 
|-id=675 bgcolor=#d6d6d6
| 558675 ||  || — || January 17, 2015 || Haleakala || Pan-STARRS ||  || align=right | 2.5 km || 
|-id=676 bgcolor=#d6d6d6
| 558676 ||  || — || September 9, 2007 || Kitt Peak || Spacewatch ||  || align=right | 2.2 km || 
|-id=677 bgcolor=#d6d6d6
| 558677 ||  || — || January 17, 2015 || Haleakala || Pan-STARRS ||  || align=right | 2.1 km || 
|-id=678 bgcolor=#d6d6d6
| 558678 ||  || — || November 2, 2013 || Mount Lemmon || Mount Lemmon Survey ||  || align=right | 2.7 km || 
|-id=679 bgcolor=#d6d6d6
| 558679 ||  || — || August 14, 2012 || Haleakala || Pan-STARRS ||  || align=right | 3.5 km || 
|-id=680 bgcolor=#d6d6d6
| 558680 ||  || — || November 4, 2013 || Haleakala || Pan-STARRS ||  || align=right | 2.4 km || 
|-id=681 bgcolor=#d6d6d6
| 558681 ||  || — || August 10, 2007 || Kitt Peak || Spacewatch ||  || align=right | 2.1 km || 
|-id=682 bgcolor=#d6d6d6
| 558682 ||  || — || October 8, 2008 || Kitt Peak || Spacewatch ||  || align=right | 1.8 km || 
|-id=683 bgcolor=#d6d6d6
| 558683 ||  || — || September 13, 2007 || Kitt Peak || Spacewatch ||  || align=right | 2.7 km || 
|-id=684 bgcolor=#E9E9E9
| 558684 ||  || — || December 14, 2004 || Calvin-Rehoboth || L. A. Molnar ||  || align=right | 2.5 km || 
|-id=685 bgcolor=#d6d6d6
| 558685 ||  || — || January 17, 2015 || Haleakala || Pan-STARRS ||  || align=right | 2.9 km || 
|-id=686 bgcolor=#d6d6d6
| 558686 ||  || — || March 12, 2010 || Kitt Peak || Spacewatch ||  || align=right | 2.4 km || 
|-id=687 bgcolor=#d6d6d6
| 558687 ||  || — || October 23, 2013 || Haleakala || Pan-STARRS ||  || align=right | 2.7 km || 
|-id=688 bgcolor=#d6d6d6
| 558688 ||  || — || January 17, 2015 || Haleakala || Pan-STARRS ||  || align=right | 2.7 km || 
|-id=689 bgcolor=#d6d6d6
| 558689 ||  || — || August 9, 2012 || Haleakala || Pan-STARRS ||  || align=right | 2.2 km || 
|-id=690 bgcolor=#d6d6d6
| 558690 ||  || — || September 13, 2013 || Mount Lemmon || Mount Lemmon Survey ||  || align=right | 2.0 km || 
|-id=691 bgcolor=#d6d6d6
| 558691 ||  || — || January 18, 2015 || ESA OGS || ESA OGS ||  || align=right | 2.6 km || 
|-id=692 bgcolor=#d6d6d6
| 558692 ||  || — || September 29, 2008 || Kitt Peak || Spacewatch ||  || align=right | 3.3 km || 
|-id=693 bgcolor=#E9E9E9
| 558693 ||  || — || June 29, 2001 || Kitt Peak || Spacewatch ||  || align=right | 1.1 km || 
|-id=694 bgcolor=#d6d6d6
| 558694 ||  || — || October 3, 2013 || Haleakala || Pan-STARRS ||  || align=right | 2.2 km || 
|-id=695 bgcolor=#d6d6d6
| 558695 ||  || — || December 26, 2014 || Mount Lemmon || Pan-STARRS ||  || align=right | 2.2 km || 
|-id=696 bgcolor=#d6d6d6
| 558696 ||  || — || September 24, 2008 || Kitt Peak || Spacewatch ||  || align=right | 2.0 km || 
|-id=697 bgcolor=#d6d6d6
| 558697 ||  || — || January 18, 2015 || Mount Lemmon || Mount Lemmon Survey ||  || align=right | 2.6 km || 
|-id=698 bgcolor=#d6d6d6
| 558698 ||  || — || November 26, 2014 || Mount Lemmon || Mount Lemmon Survey ||  || align=right | 3.3 km || 
|-id=699 bgcolor=#d6d6d6
| 558699 ||  || — || October 2, 2013 || Haleakala || Pan-STARRS ||  || align=right | 2.3 km || 
|-id=700 bgcolor=#d6d6d6
| 558700 ||  || — || February 15, 2010 || Catalina || CSS ||  || align=right | 2.6 km || 
|}

558701–558800 

|-bgcolor=#d6d6d6
| 558701 ||  || — || December 29, 2014 || Haleakala || Pan-STARRS ||  || align=right | 2.1 km || 
|-id=702 bgcolor=#d6d6d6
| 558702 ||  || — || December 15, 2004 || Kitt Peak || Spacewatch ||  || align=right | 2.1 km || 
|-id=703 bgcolor=#d6d6d6
| 558703 ||  || — || March 15, 2004 || Kitt Peak || Spacewatch ||  || align=right | 2.8 km || 
|-id=704 bgcolor=#d6d6d6
| 558704 ||  || — || January 18, 2015 || Haleakala || Pan-STARRS ||  || align=right | 2.7 km || 
|-id=705 bgcolor=#d6d6d6
| 558705 ||  || — || August 13, 2012 || Haleakala || Pan-STARRS ||  || align=right | 3.4 km || 
|-id=706 bgcolor=#d6d6d6
| 558706 ||  || — || August 12, 2006 || Palomar || NEAT ||  || align=right | 3.9 km || 
|-id=707 bgcolor=#d6d6d6
| 558707 ||  || — || November 6, 2008 || Mount Lemmon || Mount Lemmon Survey ||  || align=right | 3.0 km || 
|-id=708 bgcolor=#FA8072
| 558708 ||  || — || August 25, 2011 || Siding Spring || SSS ||  || align=right data-sort-value="0.58" | 580 m || 
|-id=709 bgcolor=#d6d6d6
| 558709 ||  || — || September 21, 2007 || Kitt Peak || Spacewatch ||  || align=right | 3.4 km || 
|-id=710 bgcolor=#d6d6d6
| 558710 ||  || — || December 21, 2014 || Haleakala || Pan-STARRS ||  || align=right | 2.7 km || 
|-id=711 bgcolor=#d6d6d6
| 558711 ||  || — || December 21, 2014 || Haleakala || Pan-STARRS ||  || align=right | 2.8 km || 
|-id=712 bgcolor=#d6d6d6
| 558712 ||  || — || September 30, 2003 || Apache Point || SDSS Collaboration ||  || align=right | 1.9 km || 
|-id=713 bgcolor=#d6d6d6
| 558713 ||  || — || February 19, 2010 || Mount Lemmon || Mount Lemmon Survey ||  || align=right | 2.5 km || 
|-id=714 bgcolor=#d6d6d6
| 558714 ||  || — || January 16, 2015 || Mount Lemmon || Mount Lemmon Survey ||  || align=right | 2.9 km || 
|-id=715 bgcolor=#d6d6d6
| 558715 ||  || — || May 21, 2011 || Mount Lemmon || Mount Lemmon Survey ||  || align=right | 2.8 km || 
|-id=716 bgcolor=#d6d6d6
| 558716 ||  || — || January 16, 2015 || Mount Lemmon || Mount Lemmon Survey ||  || align=right | 2.9 km || 
|-id=717 bgcolor=#d6d6d6
| 558717 ||  || — || August 14, 2001 || Haleakala || AMOS || EOS || align=right | 2.0 km || 
|-id=718 bgcolor=#d6d6d6
| 558718 ||  || — || December 29, 2008 || Mount Lemmon || Mount Lemmon Survey ||  || align=right | 2.4 km || 
|-id=719 bgcolor=#d6d6d6
| 558719 ||  || — || October 12, 2013 || Kitt Peak || Spacewatch ||  || align=right | 1.6 km || 
|-id=720 bgcolor=#d6d6d6
| 558720 ||  || — || November 11, 2007 || Mount Lemmon || Mount Lemmon Survey ||  || align=right | 2.1 km || 
|-id=721 bgcolor=#d6d6d6
| 558721 ||  || — || October 24, 2013 || Mount Lemmon || Mount Lemmon Survey ||  || align=right | 2.0 km || 
|-id=722 bgcolor=#d6d6d6
| 558722 ||  || — || October 26, 2008 || Kitt Peak || Spacewatch ||  || align=right | 2.7 km || 
|-id=723 bgcolor=#d6d6d6
| 558723 ||  || — || January 19, 2004 || Kitt Peak || Spacewatch ||  || align=right | 2.8 km || 
|-id=724 bgcolor=#d6d6d6
| 558724 ||  || — || November 20, 2008 || Kitt Peak || Spacewatch ||  || align=right | 2.0 km || 
|-id=725 bgcolor=#d6d6d6
| 558725 ||  || — || December 25, 2013 || Haleakala || Pan-STARRS ||  || align=right | 3.0 km || 
|-id=726 bgcolor=#d6d6d6
| 558726 ||  || — || January 20, 2015 || Haleakala || Pan-STARRS ||  || align=right | 3.3 km || 
|-id=727 bgcolor=#d6d6d6
| 558727 ||  || — || November 24, 2009 || Kitt Peak || Spacewatch ||  || align=right | 2.7 km || 
|-id=728 bgcolor=#d6d6d6
| 558728 ||  || — || December 11, 2014 || Mount Lemmon || Mount Lemmon Survey ||  || align=right | 2.2 km || 
|-id=729 bgcolor=#E9E9E9
| 558729 ||  || — || March 12, 2011 || Mount Lemmon || Mount Lemmon Survey ||  || align=right | 1.9 km || 
|-id=730 bgcolor=#d6d6d6
| 558730 ||  || — || November 24, 2013 || Haleakala || Pan-STARRS ||  || align=right | 4.1 km || 
|-id=731 bgcolor=#d6d6d6
| 558731 ||  || — || February 11, 2004 || Kitt Peak || Spacewatch ||  || align=right | 3.0 km || 
|-id=732 bgcolor=#d6d6d6
| 558732 ||  || — || November 4, 2013 || Haleakala || Pan-STARRS ||  || align=right | 3.1 km || 
|-id=733 bgcolor=#E9E9E9
| 558733 ||  || — || March 29, 2011 || Mount Lemmon || Mount Lemmon Survey ||  || align=right | 1.9 km || 
|-id=734 bgcolor=#d6d6d6
| 558734 ||  || — || December 29, 2014 || Haleakala || Pan-STARRS ||  || align=right | 2.5 km || 
|-id=735 bgcolor=#d6d6d6
| 558735 ||  || — || September 4, 2003 || Kitt Peak || Spacewatch ||  || align=right | 1.8 km || 
|-id=736 bgcolor=#C2FFFF
| 558736 ||  || — || April 4, 2008 || Mount Lemmon || Mount Lemmon Survey || L5 || align=right | 7.2 km || 
|-id=737 bgcolor=#E9E9E9
| 558737 ||  || — || January 17, 2015 || Haleakala || Pan-STARRS ||  || align=right | 1.7 km || 
|-id=738 bgcolor=#d6d6d6
| 558738 ||  || — || January 17, 2015 || Mount Lemmon || Mount Lemmon Survey ||  || align=right | 2.2 km || 
|-id=739 bgcolor=#E9E9E9
| 558739 ||  || — || October 5, 2013 || Haleakala || Pan-STARRS ||  || align=right | 2.3 km || 
|-id=740 bgcolor=#E9E9E9
| 558740 ||  || — || December 30, 2005 || Kitt Peak || Spacewatch ||  || align=right | 1.5 km || 
|-id=741 bgcolor=#d6d6d6
| 558741 ||  || — || March 13, 2005 || Kitt Peak || Spacewatch ||  || align=right | 2.4 km || 
|-id=742 bgcolor=#d6d6d6
| 558742 ||  || — || December 1, 2003 || Kitt Peak || Spacewatch ||  || align=right | 3.6 km || 
|-id=743 bgcolor=#d6d6d6
| 558743 ||  || — || November 19, 2008 || Mount Lemmon || Mount Lemmon Survey ||  || align=right | 3.1 km || 
|-id=744 bgcolor=#d6d6d6
| 558744 ||  || — || February 9, 2005 || Mount Lemmon || Mount Lemmon Survey ||  || align=right | 2.5 km || 
|-id=745 bgcolor=#d6d6d6
| 558745 ||  || — || November 6, 2008 || Kitt Peak || Spacewatch ||  || align=right | 2.0 km || 
|-id=746 bgcolor=#d6d6d6
| 558746 ||  || — || March 14, 2010 || Kitt Peak || Spacewatch ||  || align=right | 2.1 km || 
|-id=747 bgcolor=#d6d6d6
| 558747 ||  || — || February 9, 2005 || Kitt Peak || Spacewatch ||  || align=right | 3.1 km || 
|-id=748 bgcolor=#d6d6d6
| 558748 ||  || — || December 28, 2008 || Dauban || C. Rinner, F. Kugel || EOS || align=right | 2.5 km || 
|-id=749 bgcolor=#d6d6d6
| 558749 ||  || — || November 10, 2013 || Mount Lemmon || Mount Lemmon Survey ||  || align=right | 1.9 km || 
|-id=750 bgcolor=#d6d6d6
| 558750 ||  || — || December 26, 2014 || Haleakala || Pan-STARRS ||  || align=right | 2.6 km || 
|-id=751 bgcolor=#d6d6d6
| 558751 ||  || — || October 23, 2013 || Mount Lemmon || Mount Lemmon Survey || KOR || align=right | 1.1 km || 
|-id=752 bgcolor=#d6d6d6
| 558752 ||  || — || January 11, 2010 || Kitt Peak || Spacewatch ||  || align=right | 2.2 km || 
|-id=753 bgcolor=#d6d6d6
| 558753 ||  || — || January 17, 2015 || Haleakala || Pan-STARRS ||  || align=right | 2.4 km || 
|-id=754 bgcolor=#d6d6d6
| 558754 ||  || — || November 11, 2013 || Mount Lemmon || Mount Lemmon Survey ||  || align=right | 2.6 km || 
|-id=755 bgcolor=#E9E9E9
| 558755 ||  || — || August 15, 2004 || Campo Imperatore || CINEOS ||  || align=right | 2.0 km || 
|-id=756 bgcolor=#E9E9E9
| 558756 ||  || — || January 16, 2015 || Mount Lemmon || Mount Lemmon Survey ||  || align=right | 1.9 km || 
|-id=757 bgcolor=#d6d6d6
| 558757 ||  || — || February 17, 2004 || Kitt Peak || Spacewatch ||  || align=right | 2.7 km || 
|-id=758 bgcolor=#d6d6d6
| 558758 ||  || — || January 17, 2015 || Haleakala || Pan-STARRS ||  || align=right | 3.1 km || 
|-id=759 bgcolor=#d6d6d6
| 558759 ||  || — || June 16, 2007 || Kitt Peak || Spacewatch ||  || align=right | 2.8 km || 
|-id=760 bgcolor=#d6d6d6
| 558760 ||  || — || January 17, 2015 || Haleakala || Pan-STARRS ||  || align=right | 2.0 km || 
|-id=761 bgcolor=#d6d6d6
| 558761 ||  || — || January 17, 2015 || Haleakala || Pan-STARRS ||  || align=right | 2.5 km || 
|-id=762 bgcolor=#d6d6d6
| 558762 ||  || — || January 17, 2015 || Haleakala || Pan-STARRS ||  || align=right | 2.3 km || 
|-id=763 bgcolor=#d6d6d6
| 558763 ||  || — || February 13, 2010 || Mount Lemmon || Mount Lemmon Survey || EOS || align=right | 1.3 km || 
|-id=764 bgcolor=#d6d6d6
| 558764 ||  || — || August 17, 2012 || Haleakala || Pan-STARRS ||  || align=right | 2.9 km || 
|-id=765 bgcolor=#d6d6d6
| 558765 ||  || — || September 11, 2007 || Mount Lemmon || Mount Lemmon Survey ||  || align=right | 2.5 km || 
|-id=766 bgcolor=#d6d6d6
| 558766 ||  || — || April 12, 2000 || Kitt Peak || Spacewatch ||  || align=right | 2.0 km || 
|-id=767 bgcolor=#d6d6d6
| 558767 ||  || — || October 5, 2002 || Palomar || NEAT ||  || align=right | 3.1 km || 
|-id=768 bgcolor=#d6d6d6
| 558768 ||  || — || September 23, 2008 || Mount Lemmon || Mount Lemmon Survey ||  || align=right | 1.9 km || 
|-id=769 bgcolor=#d6d6d6
| 558769 ||  || — || May 1, 2011 || Haleakala || Pan-STARRS ||  || align=right | 2.4 km || 
|-id=770 bgcolor=#d6d6d6
| 558770 ||  || — || January 17, 2015 || Haleakala || Pan-STARRS ||  || align=right | 2.4 km || 
|-id=771 bgcolor=#d6d6d6
| 558771 ||  || — || August 11, 2002 || Cerro Tololo || M. W. Buie, S. D. Kern || TEL || align=right | 1.2 km || 
|-id=772 bgcolor=#d6d6d6
| 558772 ||  || — || December 19, 2004 || Mount Lemmon || Mount Lemmon Survey ||  || align=right | 2.6 km || 
|-id=773 bgcolor=#d6d6d6
| 558773 ||  || — || July 14, 2013 || Haleakala || Pan-STARRS ||  || align=right | 2.4 km || 
|-id=774 bgcolor=#d6d6d6
| 558774 ||  || — || November 20, 2003 || Kitt Peak || Spacewatch ||  || align=right | 1.7 km || 
|-id=775 bgcolor=#d6d6d6
| 558775 ||  || — || October 3, 2002 || Palomar || NEAT ||  || align=right | 3.2 km || 
|-id=776 bgcolor=#d6d6d6
| 558776 ||  || — || November 19, 2008 || Mount Lemmon || Mount Lemmon Survey ||  || align=right | 2.4 km || 
|-id=777 bgcolor=#d6d6d6
| 558777 ||  || — || March 10, 2005 || Mount Lemmon || Mount Lemmon Survey ||  || align=right | 2.3 km || 
|-id=778 bgcolor=#d6d6d6
| 558778 ||  || — || January 17, 2015 || Haleakala || Pan-STARRS ||  || align=right | 2.5 km || 
|-id=779 bgcolor=#d6d6d6
| 558779 ||  || — || October 24, 2013 || Mount Lemmon || Mount Lemmon Survey ||  || align=right | 2.1 km || 
|-id=780 bgcolor=#d6d6d6
| 558780 ||  || — || September 13, 2012 || Mount Lemmon || Mount Lemmon Survey ||  || align=right | 2.1 km || 
|-id=781 bgcolor=#d6d6d6
| 558781 ||  || — || November 27, 2013 || Haleakala || Pan-STARRS ||  || align=right | 2.8 km || 
|-id=782 bgcolor=#d6d6d6
| 558782 ||  || — || September 23, 2008 || Mount Lemmon || Mount Lemmon Survey ||  || align=right | 2.2 km || 
|-id=783 bgcolor=#d6d6d6
| 558783 ||  || — || September 12, 2007 || Kitt Peak || Spacewatch ||  || align=right | 2.0 km || 
|-id=784 bgcolor=#d6d6d6
| 558784 ||  || — || November 9, 2013 || Haleakala || Pan-STARRS ||  || align=right | 2.4 km || 
|-id=785 bgcolor=#d6d6d6
| 558785 ||  || — || January 19, 2004 || Kitt Peak || Spacewatch ||  || align=right | 2.6 km || 
|-id=786 bgcolor=#E9E9E9
| 558786 ||  || — || July 18, 2013 || Haleakala || Pan-STARRS ||  || align=right | 1.9 km || 
|-id=787 bgcolor=#d6d6d6
| 558787 ||  || — || May 11, 2011 || Kitt Peak || Spacewatch ||  || align=right | 2.5 km || 
|-id=788 bgcolor=#d6d6d6
| 558788 ||  || — || January 17, 2015 || Haleakala || Pan-STARRS ||  || align=right | 2.4 km || 
|-id=789 bgcolor=#d6d6d6
| 558789 ||  || — || September 28, 2013 || Mount Lemmon || Mount Lemmon Survey ||  || align=right | 2.2 km || 
|-id=790 bgcolor=#E9E9E9
| 558790 ||  || — || October 27, 2009 || Catalina || CSS ||  || align=right | 1.0 km || 
|-id=791 bgcolor=#d6d6d6
| 558791 ||  || — || October 3, 2008 || Kitt Peak || Spacewatch ||  || align=right | 1.8 km || 
|-id=792 bgcolor=#E9E9E9
| 558792 ||  || — || May 27, 2012 || Mount Lemmon || Mount Lemmon Survey ||  || align=right | 1.9 km || 
|-id=793 bgcolor=#d6d6d6
| 558793 ||  || — || October 26, 2013 || Mount Lemmon || Mount Lemmon Survey || KOR || align=right | 1.1 km || 
|-id=794 bgcolor=#E9E9E9
| 558794 ||  || — || August 23, 2003 || Palomar || NEAT ||  || align=right | 2.3 km || 
|-id=795 bgcolor=#d6d6d6
| 558795 ||  || — || January 17, 2015 || Haleakala || Pan-STARRS ||  || align=right | 2.6 km || 
|-id=796 bgcolor=#d6d6d6
| 558796 ||  || — || January 17, 2015 || Haleakala || Pan-STARRS ||  || align=right | 2.5 km || 
|-id=797 bgcolor=#d6d6d6
| 558797 ||  || — || January 17, 2015 || Haleakala || Pan-STARRS ||  || align=right | 2.0 km || 
|-id=798 bgcolor=#d6d6d6
| 558798 ||  || — || October 12, 2013 || Mount Lemmon || Mount Lemmon Survey ||  || align=right | 2.0 km || 
|-id=799 bgcolor=#d6d6d6
| 558799 ||  || — || October 23, 2013 || Mount Lemmon || Mount Lemmon Survey || KOR || align=right | 1.2 km || 
|-id=800 bgcolor=#d6d6d6
| 558800 ||  || — || June 18, 2006 || Kitt Peak || Spacewatch ||  || align=right | 2.7 km || 
|}

558801–558900 

|-bgcolor=#d6d6d6
| 558801 ||  || — || September 19, 2007 || Kitt Peak || Spacewatch ||  || align=right | 2.8 km || 
|-id=802 bgcolor=#fefefe
| 558802 ||  || — || January 17, 2015 || Haleakala || Pan-STARRS ||  || align=right data-sort-value="0.62" | 620 m || 
|-id=803 bgcolor=#d6d6d6
| 558803 ||  || — || February 17, 2010 || Kitt Peak || Spacewatch ||  || align=right | 2.2 km || 
|-id=804 bgcolor=#d6d6d6
| 558804 ||  || — || March 16, 2010 || Mount Lemmon || Mount Lemmon Survey ||  || align=right | 2.5 km || 
|-id=805 bgcolor=#d6d6d6
| 558805 ||  || — || January 17, 2015 || Haleakala || Pan-STARRS ||  || align=right | 2.5 km || 
|-id=806 bgcolor=#d6d6d6
| 558806 ||  || — || August 14, 2012 || Haleakala || Pan-STARRS ||  || align=right | 2.4 km || 
|-id=807 bgcolor=#d6d6d6
| 558807 ||  || — || January 17, 2015 || Haleakala || Pan-STARRS ||  || align=right | 2.4 km || 
|-id=808 bgcolor=#d6d6d6
| 558808 ||  || — || September 30, 2003 || Apache Point || SDSS Collaboration ||  || align=right | 1.7 km || 
|-id=809 bgcolor=#d6d6d6
| 558809 ||  || — || January 17, 2015 || Haleakala || Pan-STARRS ||  || align=right | 2.9 km || 
|-id=810 bgcolor=#d6d6d6
| 558810 ||  || — || March 9, 2005 || Mount Lemmon || Mount Lemmon Survey ||  || align=right | 2.7 km || 
|-id=811 bgcolor=#d6d6d6
| 558811 ||  || — || January 17, 2015 || Haleakala || Pan-STARRS ||  || align=right | 2.5 km || 
|-id=812 bgcolor=#d6d6d6
| 558812 ||  || — || February 11, 2004 || Palomar || NEAT ||  || align=right | 3.4 km || 
|-id=813 bgcolor=#d6d6d6
| 558813 ||  || — || January 17, 2015 || Haleakala || Pan-STARRS ||  || align=right | 3.1 km || 
|-id=814 bgcolor=#d6d6d6
| 558814 ||  || — || September 12, 2007 || Mount Lemmon || Mount Lemmon Survey || TIR || align=right | 2.6 km || 
|-id=815 bgcolor=#d6d6d6
| 558815 ||  || — || January 17, 2015 || Haleakala || Pan-STARRS ||  || align=right | 2.2 km || 
|-id=816 bgcolor=#E9E9E9
| 558816 ||  || — || October 7, 2004 || Palomar || NEAT ||  || align=right | 2.0 km || 
|-id=817 bgcolor=#d6d6d6
| 558817 ||  || — || September 24, 2008 || Mount Lemmon || Mount Lemmon Survey ||  || align=right | 2.2 km || 
|-id=818 bgcolor=#E9E9E9
| 558818 ||  || — || May 19, 2012 || Mount Lemmon || Mount Lemmon Survey ||  || align=right | 2.0 km || 
|-id=819 bgcolor=#d6d6d6
| 558819 ||  || — || January 17, 2015 || Haleakala || Pan-STARRS ||  || align=right | 1.8 km || 
|-id=820 bgcolor=#d6d6d6
| 558820 ||  || — || September 29, 2003 || Kitt Peak || Spacewatch ||  || align=right | 2.1 km || 
|-id=821 bgcolor=#d6d6d6
| 558821 ||  || — || December 23, 2014 || Mount Lemmon || Mount Lemmon Survey ||  || align=right | 2.0 km || 
|-id=822 bgcolor=#d6d6d6
| 558822 ||  || — || January 18, 2015 || Mount Lemmon || Spacewatch ||  || align=right | 2.0 km || 
|-id=823 bgcolor=#d6d6d6
| 558823 ||  || — || May 23, 2001 || Cerro Tololo || J. L. Elliot, L. H. Wasserman ||  || align=right | 2.5 km || 
|-id=824 bgcolor=#E9E9E9
| 558824 ||  || — || December 7, 2005 || Kitt Peak || Spacewatch ||  || align=right | 1.6 km || 
|-id=825 bgcolor=#d6d6d6
| 558825 ||  || — || November 26, 2014 || Haleakala || Pan-STARRS ||  || align=right | 2.0 km || 
|-id=826 bgcolor=#E9E9E9
| 558826 ||  || — || November 22, 2005 || Kitt Peak || Spacewatch ||  || align=right | 2.2 km || 
|-id=827 bgcolor=#d6d6d6
| 558827 ||  || — || September 29, 2008 || Kitt Peak || Spacewatch ||  || align=right | 2.5 km || 
|-id=828 bgcolor=#d6d6d6
| 558828 ||  || — || February 18, 2010 || Mount Lemmon || Mount Lemmon Survey ||  || align=right | 2.3 km || 
|-id=829 bgcolor=#d6d6d6
| 558829 ||  || — || September 2, 2008 || Kitt Peak || Spacewatch ||  || align=right | 2.2 km || 
|-id=830 bgcolor=#d6d6d6
| 558830 ||  || — || January 18, 2015 || Mount Lemmon || Mount Lemmon Survey ||  || align=right | 2.1 km || 
|-id=831 bgcolor=#d6d6d6
| 558831 ||  || — || January 18, 2015 || Haleakala || Pan-STARRS ||  || align=right | 2.0 km || 
|-id=832 bgcolor=#E9E9E9
| 558832 ||  || — || November 9, 2009 || Kitt Peak || Spacewatch ||  || align=right | 2.2 km || 
|-id=833 bgcolor=#E9E9E9
| 558833 ||  || — || September 30, 2013 || Mount Lemmon || Mount Lemmon Survey ||  || align=right | 1.7 km || 
|-id=834 bgcolor=#d6d6d6
| 558834 ||  || — || January 18, 2015 || Haleakala || Pan-STARRS ||  || align=right | 1.8 km || 
|-id=835 bgcolor=#d6d6d6
| 558835 ||  || — || February 13, 2004 || Kitt Peak || Spacewatch ||  || align=right | 2.3 km || 
|-id=836 bgcolor=#d6d6d6
| 558836 ||  || — || December 26, 2014 || Haleakala || Pan-STARRS ||  || align=right | 2.0 km || 
|-id=837 bgcolor=#E9E9E9
| 558837 ||  || — || April 28, 2012 || Mount Lemmon || Mount Lemmon Survey ||  || align=right | 2.4 km || 
|-id=838 bgcolor=#d6d6d6
| 558838 ||  || — || September 13, 2007 || Kitt Peak || Spacewatch ||  || align=right | 3.2 km || 
|-id=839 bgcolor=#d6d6d6
| 558839 ||  || — || May 6, 2006 || Mount Lemmon || Mount Lemmon Survey || EOS || align=right | 1.8 km || 
|-id=840 bgcolor=#d6d6d6
| 558840 ||  || — || December 3, 2008 || Mount Lemmon || Mount Lemmon Survey ||  || align=right | 2.4 km || 
|-id=841 bgcolor=#d6d6d6
| 558841 ||  || — || December 18, 2009 || Kitt Peak || Spacewatch ||  || align=right | 1.8 km || 
|-id=842 bgcolor=#d6d6d6
| 558842 ||  || — || October 26, 2008 || Kitt Peak || Spacewatch ||  || align=right | 2.0 km || 
|-id=843 bgcolor=#E9E9E9
| 558843 ||  || — || December 30, 2005 || Mount Lemmon || Mount Lemmon Survey || AEO || align=right data-sort-value="0.90" | 900 m || 
|-id=844 bgcolor=#d6d6d6
| 558844 ||  || — || October 30, 2008 || Kitt Peak || Spacewatch || EOS || align=right | 1.7 km || 
|-id=845 bgcolor=#E9E9E9
| 558845 ||  || — || October 9, 2004 || Kitt Peak || Spacewatch ||  || align=right | 1.9 km || 
|-id=846 bgcolor=#E9E9E9
| 558846 ||  || — || December 26, 2014 || Haleakala || Pan-STARRS ||  || align=right | 1.5 km || 
|-id=847 bgcolor=#d6d6d6
| 558847 ||  || — || May 1, 2011 || Haleakala || Pan-STARRS ||  || align=right | 2.0 km || 
|-id=848 bgcolor=#d6d6d6
| 558848 ||  || — || December 21, 2014 || Haleakala || Pan-STARRS ||  || align=right | 2.4 km || 
|-id=849 bgcolor=#d6d6d6
| 558849 ||  || — || December 21, 2014 || Haleakala || Pan-STARRS ||  || align=right | 1.8 km || 
|-id=850 bgcolor=#d6d6d6
| 558850 ||  || — || September 26, 2013 || Mount Lemmon || Mount Lemmon Survey ||  || align=right | 2.7 km || 
|-id=851 bgcolor=#d6d6d6
| 558851 ||  || — || October 10, 2008 || Mount Lemmon || Mount Lemmon Survey ||  || align=right | 2.2 km || 
|-id=852 bgcolor=#d6d6d6
| 558852 ||  || — || January 18, 2015 || Mount Lemmon || Mount Lemmon Survey ||  || align=right | 1.8 km || 
|-id=853 bgcolor=#d6d6d6
| 558853 ||  || — || October 3, 2013 || Kitt Peak || Spacewatch ||  || align=right | 2.4 km || 
|-id=854 bgcolor=#d6d6d6
| 558854 ||  || — || September 24, 2008 || Kitt Peak || Spacewatch ||  || align=right | 1.9 km || 
|-id=855 bgcolor=#d6d6d6
| 558855 ||  || — || April 4, 2011 || Kitt Peak || Spacewatch ||  || align=right | 1.8 km || 
|-id=856 bgcolor=#E9E9E9
| 558856 ||  || — || October 23, 2013 || Mount Lemmon || Mount Lemmon Survey ||  || align=right | 1.9 km || 
|-id=857 bgcolor=#d6d6d6
| 558857 ||  || — || September 3, 2013 || Kitt Peak || Spacewatch ||  || align=right | 2.1 km || 
|-id=858 bgcolor=#d6d6d6
| 558858 ||  || — || March 11, 2005 || Kitt Peak || M. W. Buie, L. H. Wasserman || EOS || align=right | 1.5 km || 
|-id=859 bgcolor=#d6d6d6
| 558859 ||  || — || February 16, 2010 || Mount Lemmon || Mount Lemmon Survey ||  || align=right | 2.1 km || 
|-id=860 bgcolor=#d6d6d6
| 558860 ||  || — || January 18, 2015 || Haleakala || Pan-STARRS ||  || align=right | 2.1 km || 
|-id=861 bgcolor=#d6d6d6
| 558861 ||  || — || March 14, 2011 || Mount Lemmon || Mount Lemmon Survey ||  || align=right | 1.9 km || 
|-id=862 bgcolor=#d6d6d6
| 558862 ||  || — || October 4, 2008 || Catalina || CSS ||  || align=right | 2.9 km || 
|-id=863 bgcolor=#d6d6d6
| 558863 ||  || — || January 18, 2015 || Kitt Peak || Pan-STARRS ||  || align=right | 2.6 km || 
|-id=864 bgcolor=#d6d6d6
| 558864 ||  || — || January 18, 2015 || Haleakala || Pan-STARRS ||  || align=right | 2.6 km || 
|-id=865 bgcolor=#d6d6d6
| 558865 ||  || — || October 1, 2008 || Mount Lemmon || Mount Lemmon Survey || KOR || align=right | 1.2 km || 
|-id=866 bgcolor=#d6d6d6
| 558866 ||  || — || February 14, 2010 || Mount Lemmon || Mount Lemmon Survey || EOS || align=right | 1.4 km || 
|-id=867 bgcolor=#d6d6d6
| 558867 ||  || — || January 27, 2004 || Kitt Peak || Spacewatch || HYG || align=right | 3.0 km || 
|-id=868 bgcolor=#d6d6d6
| 558868 ||  || — || September 5, 2007 || Siding Spring || K. Sárneczky, L. Kiss ||  || align=right | 3.8 km || 
|-id=869 bgcolor=#d6d6d6
| 558869 ||  || — || January 18, 2015 || Haleakala || Pan-STARRS ||  || align=right | 2.5 km || 
|-id=870 bgcolor=#d6d6d6
| 558870 ||  || — || September 15, 2013 || Mount Lemmon || Mount Lemmon Survey ||  || align=right | 2.6 km || 
|-id=871 bgcolor=#d6d6d6
| 558871 ||  || — || October 1, 2008 || Mount Lemmon || Mount Lemmon Survey || KOR || align=right | 1.1 km || 
|-id=872 bgcolor=#E9E9E9
| 558872 ||  || — || January 18, 2015 || Haleakala || Pan-STARRS ||  || align=right data-sort-value="0.84" | 840 m || 
|-id=873 bgcolor=#d6d6d6
| 558873 ||  || — || January 18, 2015 || Haleakala || Pan-STARRS ||  || align=right | 1.9 km || 
|-id=874 bgcolor=#d6d6d6
| 558874 ||  || — || January 22, 2004 || Socorro || LINEAR ||  || align=right | 2.5 km || 
|-id=875 bgcolor=#d6d6d6
| 558875 ||  || — || January 18, 2004 || Palomar || NEAT ||  || align=right | 2.5 km || 
|-id=876 bgcolor=#d6d6d6
| 558876 ||  || — || December 27, 2014 || Mount Lemmon || Mount Lemmon Survey ||  || align=right | 2.8 km || 
|-id=877 bgcolor=#d6d6d6
| 558877 ||  || — || September 15, 2007 || Goodricke-Pigott || R. A. Tucker || EOS || align=right | 2.3 km || 
|-id=878 bgcolor=#d6d6d6
| 558878 ||  || — || January 18, 2015 || Haleakala || Pan-STARRS ||  || align=right | 1.9 km || 
|-id=879 bgcolor=#d6d6d6
| 558879 ||  || — || January 28, 2004 || Kitt Peak || Spacewatch ||  || align=right | 2.2 km || 
|-id=880 bgcolor=#d6d6d6
| 558880 ||  || — || January 18, 2015 || Haleakala || Pan-STARRS ||  || align=right | 2.3 km || 
|-id=881 bgcolor=#d6d6d6
| 558881 ||  || — || October 23, 2008 || Kitt Peak || Spacewatch || EOS || align=right | 2.5 km || 
|-id=882 bgcolor=#d6d6d6
| 558882 ||  || — || November 1, 2008 || Mount Lemmon || Mount Lemmon Survey ||  || align=right | 3.2 km || 
|-id=883 bgcolor=#E9E9E9
| 558883 ||  || — || September 15, 2013 || Haleakala || Pan-STARRS ||  || align=right | 1.9 km || 
|-id=884 bgcolor=#E9E9E9
| 558884 ||  || — || March 15, 2007 || Mount Lemmon || Mount Lemmon Survey ||  || align=right | 1.6 km || 
|-id=885 bgcolor=#d6d6d6
| 558885 ||  || — || January 18, 2015 || Haleakala || Pan-STARRS ||  || align=right | 2.9 km || 
|-id=886 bgcolor=#d6d6d6
| 558886 ||  || — || January 1, 2009 || Kitt Peak || Spacewatch ||  || align=right | 3.1 km || 
|-id=887 bgcolor=#d6d6d6
| 558887 ||  || — || September 6, 2007 || Siding Spring || SSS || Tj (2.99) || align=right | 3.3 km || 
|-id=888 bgcolor=#d6d6d6
| 558888 ||  || — || December 4, 2008 || Mount Lemmon || Mount Lemmon Survey ||  || align=right | 2.4 km || 
|-id=889 bgcolor=#d6d6d6
| 558889 ||  || — || September 11, 2013 || Calar Alto-CASADO || S. Mottola || EOS || align=right | 1.5 km || 
|-id=890 bgcolor=#d6d6d6
| 558890 ||  || — || August 13, 2012 || Haleakala || Pan-STARRS ||  || align=right | 2.1 km || 
|-id=891 bgcolor=#d6d6d6
| 558891 ||  || — || February 17, 2010 || Kitt Peak || Spacewatch ||  || align=right | 2.2 km || 
|-id=892 bgcolor=#d6d6d6
| 558892 ||  || — || March 18, 2010 || Mount Lemmon || Mount Lemmon Survey ||  || align=right | 2.6 km || 
|-id=893 bgcolor=#d6d6d6
| 558893 ||  || — || September 30, 2013 || Mount Lemmon || Mount Lemmon Survey ||  || align=right | 2.4 km || 
|-id=894 bgcolor=#d6d6d6
| 558894 ||  || — || December 29, 2003 || Kitt Peak || Spacewatch ||  || align=right | 2.7 km || 
|-id=895 bgcolor=#d6d6d6
| 558895 ||  || — || February 17, 2004 || Kitt Peak || Spacewatch ||  || align=right | 2.0 km || 
|-id=896 bgcolor=#d6d6d6
| 558896 ||  || — || January 18, 2015 || Mount Lemmon || Mount Lemmon Survey ||  || align=right | 2.3 km || 
|-id=897 bgcolor=#d6d6d6
| 558897 ||  || — || March 16, 2010 || Kitt Peak || Spacewatch ||  || align=right | 2.2 km || 
|-id=898 bgcolor=#d6d6d6
| 558898 ||  || — || January 18, 2015 || Haleakala || Pan-STARRS ||  || align=right | 2.4 km || 
|-id=899 bgcolor=#d6d6d6
| 558899 ||  || — || April 2, 2005 || Mount Lemmon || Mount Lemmon Survey ||  || align=right | 2.1 km || 
|-id=900 bgcolor=#d6d6d6
| 558900 ||  || — || December 3, 2008 || Mount Lemmon || Mount Lemmon Survey ||  || align=right | 3.6 km || 
|}

558901–559000 

|-bgcolor=#d6d6d6
| 558901 ||  || — || October 30, 2002 || Kitt Peak || NEAT ||  || align=right | 2.9 km || 
|-id=902 bgcolor=#d6d6d6
| 558902 ||  || — || August 8, 2005 || Cerro Tololo || Cerro Tololo Obs. ||  || align=right | 3.2 km || 
|-id=903 bgcolor=#d6d6d6
| 558903 ||  || — || December 18, 2014 || Haleakala || Pan-STARRS ||  || align=right | 2.0 km || 
|-id=904 bgcolor=#E9E9E9
| 558904 ||  || — || February 21, 2007 || Mount Lemmon || Mount Lemmon Survey ||  || align=right | 1.0 km || 
|-id=905 bgcolor=#d6d6d6
| 558905 ||  || — || April 13, 2011 || Haleakala || Pan-STARRS ||  || align=right | 2.9 km || 
|-id=906 bgcolor=#d6d6d6
| 558906 ||  || — || September 18, 2014 || Haleakala || Pan-STARRS ||  || align=right | 2.3 km || 
|-id=907 bgcolor=#E9E9E9
| 558907 ||  || — || September 22, 2014 || Haleakala || Pan-STARRS ||  || align=right | 1.4 km || 
|-id=908 bgcolor=#E9E9E9
| 558908 ||  || — || February 25, 2007 || Mount Lemmon || Mount Lemmon Survey ||  || align=right | 1.2 km || 
|-id=909 bgcolor=#d6d6d6
| 558909 ||  || — || February 23, 2010 || La Palma || La Palma Obs. ||  || align=right | 2.7 km || 
|-id=910 bgcolor=#d6d6d6
| 558910 ||  || — || January 19, 2015 || Mount Lemmon || Mount Lemmon Survey ||  || align=right | 3.3 km || 
|-id=911 bgcolor=#d6d6d6
| 558911 ||  || — || November 24, 2014 || Mount Lemmon || Mount Lemmon Survey ||  || align=right | 2.1 km || 
|-id=912 bgcolor=#E9E9E9
| 558912 ||  || — || September 3, 2005 || Catalina || CSS ||  || align=right | 1.5 km || 
|-id=913 bgcolor=#E9E9E9
| 558913 ||  || — || January 19, 2015 || Haleakala || Pan-STARRS ||  || align=right | 2.0 km || 
|-id=914 bgcolor=#d6d6d6
| 558914 ||  || — || July 13, 2013 || Mount Lemmon || Mount Lemmon Survey ||  || align=right | 2.3 km || 
|-id=915 bgcolor=#E9E9E9
| 558915 ||  || — || January 22, 2002 || Kitt Peak || Spacewatch ||  || align=right | 2.6 km || 
|-id=916 bgcolor=#d6d6d6
| 558916 ||  || — || December 30, 2008 || Mount Lemmon || Mount Lemmon Survey ||  || align=right | 1.8 km || 
|-id=917 bgcolor=#d6d6d6
| 558917 ||  || — || February 14, 2010 || Kitt Peak || Spacewatch ||  || align=right | 1.8 km || 
|-id=918 bgcolor=#d6d6d6
| 558918 ||  || — || October 28, 2013 || Mount Lemmon || Mount Lemmon Survey ||  || align=right | 2.9 km || 
|-id=919 bgcolor=#E9E9E9
| 558919 ||  || — || August 17, 2009 || Kitt Peak || Spacewatch ||  || align=right | 1.5 km || 
|-id=920 bgcolor=#fefefe
| 558920 ||  || — || December 13, 2014 || Haleakala || Pan-STARRS || H || align=right data-sort-value="0.71" | 710 m || 
|-id=921 bgcolor=#d6d6d6
| 558921 ||  || — || January 19, 2015 || Kitt Peak || Spacewatch ||  || align=right | 2.4 km || 
|-id=922 bgcolor=#E9E9E9
| 558922 ||  || — || August 30, 2005 || Palomar || NEAT ||  || align=right | 1.5 km || 
|-id=923 bgcolor=#E9E9E9
| 558923 ||  || — || February 12, 2011 || Mount Lemmon || Mount Lemmon Survey ||  || align=right | 1.5 km || 
|-id=924 bgcolor=#d6d6d6
| 558924 ||  || — || January 19, 2015 || Mount Lemmon || Mount Lemmon Survey ||  || align=right | 2.3 km || 
|-id=925 bgcolor=#d6d6d6
| 558925 ||  || — || October 9, 2013 || Mount Lemmon || Mount Lemmon Survey ||  || align=right | 2.0 km || 
|-id=926 bgcolor=#d6d6d6
| 558926 ||  || — || October 8, 2008 || Kitt Peak || Spacewatch ||  || align=right | 1.9 km || 
|-id=927 bgcolor=#d6d6d6
| 558927 ||  || — || October 3, 2013 || Haleakala || Pan-STARRS ||  || align=right | 2.6 km || 
|-id=928 bgcolor=#d6d6d6
| 558928 ||  || — || October 5, 2013 || Haleakala || Pan-STARRS ||  || align=right | 2.1 km || 
|-id=929 bgcolor=#d6d6d6
| 558929 ||  || — || October 3, 2013 || Haleakala || Pan-STARRS ||  || align=right | 2.2 km || 
|-id=930 bgcolor=#E9E9E9
| 558930 ||  || — || May 14, 2008 || Kitt Peak || Spacewatch ||  || align=right | 1.3 km || 
|-id=931 bgcolor=#E9E9E9
| 558931 ||  || — || May 15, 2012 || Mount Lemmon || Mount Lemmon Survey ||  || align=right | 2.2 km || 
|-id=932 bgcolor=#d6d6d6
| 558932 ||  || — || February 17, 2010 || Kitt Peak || Spacewatch ||  || align=right | 2.0 km || 
|-id=933 bgcolor=#d6d6d6
| 558933 ||  || — || October 3, 2013 || Kitt Peak || Spacewatch ||  || align=right | 2.7 km || 
|-id=934 bgcolor=#d6d6d6
| 558934 ||  || — || November 30, 2008 || Kitt Peak || Spacewatch ||  || align=right | 3.6 km || 
|-id=935 bgcolor=#d6d6d6
| 558935 ||  || — || January 19, 2015 || Haleakala || Pan-STARRS ||  || align=right | 2.2 km || 
|-id=936 bgcolor=#d6d6d6
| 558936 ||  || — || December 21, 2008 || Catalina || CSS ||  || align=right | 3.0 km || 
|-id=937 bgcolor=#d6d6d6
| 558937 ||  || — || November 23, 2014 || Haleakala || Pan-STARRS ||  || align=right | 2.8 km || 
|-id=938 bgcolor=#d6d6d6
| 558938 ||  || — || January 19, 2015 || Haleakala || Pan-STARRS ||  || align=right | 2.1 km || 
|-id=939 bgcolor=#d6d6d6
| 558939 ||  || — || January 19, 2015 || Haleakala || Pan-STARRS ||  || align=right | 2.0 km || 
|-id=940 bgcolor=#d6d6d6
| 558940 ||  || — || November 20, 2008 || Kitt Peak || Spacewatch ||  || align=right | 2.4 km || 
|-id=941 bgcolor=#d6d6d6
| 558941 ||  || — || September 10, 2007 || Mount Lemmon || Mount Lemmon Survey ||  || align=right | 2.5 km || 
|-id=942 bgcolor=#d6d6d6
| 558942 ||  || — || May 6, 2011 || Mount Lemmon || Mount Lemmon Survey ||  || align=right | 2.2 km || 
|-id=943 bgcolor=#E9E9E9
| 558943 ||  || — || December 2, 2005 || Kitt Peak || Spacewatch ||  || align=right | 2.2 km || 
|-id=944 bgcolor=#d6d6d6
| 558944 ||  || — || October 7, 2013 || Mount Lemmon || Mount Lemmon Survey ||  || align=right | 3.3 km || 
|-id=945 bgcolor=#d6d6d6
| 558945 ||  || — || February 18, 2010 || Mount Lemmon || Mount Lemmon Survey ||  || align=right | 1.9 km || 
|-id=946 bgcolor=#d6d6d6
| 558946 ||  || — || April 16, 2005 || Kitt Peak || Spacewatch ||  || align=right | 2.2 km || 
|-id=947 bgcolor=#d6d6d6
| 558947 ||  || — || February 12, 2004 || Kitt Peak || Spacewatch ||  || align=right | 2.2 km || 
|-id=948 bgcolor=#d6d6d6
| 558948 ||  || — || April 5, 2005 || Mount Lemmon || Mount Lemmon Survey ||  || align=right | 2.7 km || 
|-id=949 bgcolor=#d6d6d6
| 558949 ||  || — || August 13, 2012 || Palomar || Pan-STARRS ||  || align=right | 3.7 km || 
|-id=950 bgcolor=#d6d6d6
| 558950 ||  || — || November 27, 2013 || Haleakala || Pan-STARRS ||  || align=right | 2.6 km || 
|-id=951 bgcolor=#d6d6d6
| 558951 ||  || — || October 8, 2007 || Mount Lemmon || Mount Lemmon Survey ||  || align=right | 3.1 km || 
|-id=952 bgcolor=#d6d6d6
| 558952 ||  || — || September 14, 2007 || Mount Lemmon || Mount Lemmon Survey ||  || align=right | 2.7 km || 
|-id=953 bgcolor=#d6d6d6
| 558953 ||  || — || November 6, 2013 || Mount Lemmon || Mount Lemmon Survey ||  || align=right | 3.5 km || 
|-id=954 bgcolor=#d6d6d6
| 558954 ||  || — || February 3, 2009 || Mount Lemmon || Mount Lemmon Survey ||  || align=right | 2.5 km || 
|-id=955 bgcolor=#d6d6d6
| 558955 ||  || — || January 26, 2009 || Kitt Peak || Spacewatch ||  || align=right | 2.7 km || 
|-id=956 bgcolor=#d6d6d6
| 558956 ||  || — || January 19, 2015 || Haleakala || Pan-STARRS ||  || align=right | 2.9 km || 
|-id=957 bgcolor=#d6d6d6
| 558957 ||  || — || September 11, 2007 || Mount Lemmon || Mount Lemmon Survey ||  || align=right | 2.1 km || 
|-id=958 bgcolor=#d6d6d6
| 558958 ||  || — || January 20, 2015 || Mount Lemmon || Mount Lemmon Survey ||  || align=right | 2.0 km || 
|-id=959 bgcolor=#d6d6d6
| 558959 ||  || — || December 3, 2008 || Kitt Peak || Spacewatch ||  || align=right | 2.8 km || 
|-id=960 bgcolor=#d6d6d6
| 558960 ||  || — || January 6, 2010 || Kitt Peak || Spacewatch ||  || align=right | 1.7 km || 
|-id=961 bgcolor=#d6d6d6
| 558961 ||  || — || November 26, 2003 || Kitt Peak || Spacewatch ||  || align=right | 2.2 km || 
|-id=962 bgcolor=#d6d6d6
| 558962 ||  || — || November 11, 2013 || Kitt Peak || Spacewatch || VER || align=right | 2.3 km || 
|-id=963 bgcolor=#d6d6d6
| 558963 ||  || — || February 18, 2010 || Mount Lemmon || Mount Lemmon Survey ||  || align=right | 2.5 km || 
|-id=964 bgcolor=#d6d6d6
| 558964 ||  || — || January 20, 2015 || Mount Lemmon || Mount Lemmon Survey ||  || align=right | 2.4 km || 
|-id=965 bgcolor=#d6d6d6
| 558965 ||  || — || March 7, 2010 || Kitt Peak || A. Dunlap-Smith ||  || align=right | 3.9 km || 
|-id=966 bgcolor=#E9E9E9
| 558966 ||  || — || July 30, 2008 || Siding Spring || SSS ||  || align=right | 1.4 km || 
|-id=967 bgcolor=#E9E9E9
| 558967 ||  || — || May 1, 2003 || Kitt Peak || Spacewatch ||  || align=right | 2.3 km || 
|-id=968 bgcolor=#d6d6d6
| 558968 ||  || — || November 26, 2014 || Haleakala || Pan-STARRS ||  || align=right | 2.5 km || 
|-id=969 bgcolor=#d6d6d6
| 558969 ||  || — || January 16, 2015 || Mount Lemmon || Mount Lemmon Survey ||  || align=right | 2.2 km || 
|-id=970 bgcolor=#d6d6d6
| 558970 ||  || — || December 5, 2008 || Mount Lemmon || Mount Lemmon Survey ||  || align=right | 2.9 km || 
|-id=971 bgcolor=#E9E9E9
| 558971 ||  || — || February 7, 2011 || Mount Lemmon || Mount Lemmon Survey ||  || align=right | 1.8 km || 
|-id=972 bgcolor=#d6d6d6
| 558972 ||  || — || January 16, 2015 || Haleakala || Pan-STARRS ||  || align=right | 2.5 km || 
|-id=973 bgcolor=#d6d6d6
| 558973 ||  || — || October 8, 2007 || Catalina || CSS ||  || align=right | 3.9 km || 
|-id=974 bgcolor=#d6d6d6
| 558974 ||  || — || August 29, 2006 || Catalina || CSS ||  || align=right | 3.2 km || 
|-id=975 bgcolor=#d6d6d6
| 558975 ||  || — || August 14, 2012 || Kitt Peak || Pan-STARRS ||  || align=right | 3.0 km || 
|-id=976 bgcolor=#d6d6d6
| 558976 ||  || — || March 25, 2006 || Kitt Peak || Spacewatch ||  || align=right | 1.8 km || 
|-id=977 bgcolor=#d6d6d6
| 558977 ||  || — || September 23, 2008 || Mount Lemmon || Mount Lemmon Survey ||  || align=right | 1.7 km || 
|-id=978 bgcolor=#d6d6d6
| 558978 ||  || — || August 10, 2007 || Kitt Peak || Spacewatch ||  || align=right | 2.5 km || 
|-id=979 bgcolor=#d6d6d6
| 558979 ||  || — || January 17, 2015 || Haleakala || Pan-STARRS ||  || align=right | 1.8 km || 
|-id=980 bgcolor=#d6d6d6
| 558980 ||  || — || January 17, 2015 || Haleakala || Pan-STARRS ||  || align=right | 2.6 km || 
|-id=981 bgcolor=#d6d6d6
| 558981 ||  || — || September 12, 2007 || Mount Lemmon || Mount Lemmon Survey ||  || align=right | 2.7 km || 
|-id=982 bgcolor=#d6d6d6
| 558982 ||  || — || August 13, 2012 || Haleakala || Pan-STARRS ||  || align=right | 2.6 km || 
|-id=983 bgcolor=#d6d6d6
| 558983 ||  || — || October 1, 2008 || Mount Lemmon || Mount Lemmon Survey ||  || align=right | 2.8 km || 
|-id=984 bgcolor=#d6d6d6
| 558984 ||  || — || January 17, 2015 || Haleakala || Pan-STARRS ||  || align=right | 2.1 km || 
|-id=985 bgcolor=#d6d6d6
| 558985 ||  || — || January 17, 2015 || Haleakala || Pan-STARRS ||  || align=right | 2.3 km || 
|-id=986 bgcolor=#d6d6d6
| 558986 ||  || — || October 28, 2008 || Mount Lemmon || Mount Lemmon Survey ||  || align=right | 2.0 km || 
|-id=987 bgcolor=#d6d6d6
| 558987 ||  || — || April 1, 2006 || Lulin || LUSS || KOR || align=right | 1.2 km || 
|-id=988 bgcolor=#d6d6d6
| 558988 ||  || — || January 17, 2015 || Haleakala || Pan-STARRS ||  || align=right | 2.2 km || 
|-id=989 bgcolor=#d6d6d6
| 558989 ||  || — || December 21, 2008 || Mount Lemmon || Mount Lemmon Survey ||  || align=right | 2.8 km || 
|-id=990 bgcolor=#d6d6d6
| 558990 ||  || — || August 24, 2001 || Palomar || NEAT ||  || align=right | 3.2 km || 
|-id=991 bgcolor=#d6d6d6
| 558991 ||  || — || January 31, 2009 || Kitt Peak || Spacewatch ||  || align=right | 3.4 km || 
|-id=992 bgcolor=#d6d6d6
| 558992 ||  || — || May 2, 2006 || Kitt Peak || Spacewatch ||  || align=right | 2.4 km || 
|-id=993 bgcolor=#d6d6d6
| 558993 ||  || — || January 17, 2015 || Haleakala || Pan-STARRS ||  || align=right | 2.7 km || 
|-id=994 bgcolor=#d6d6d6
| 558994 ||  || — || November 4, 2013 || Mount Lemmon || Mount Lemmon Survey ||  || align=right | 1.7 km || 
|-id=995 bgcolor=#d6d6d6
| 558995 ||  || — || April 12, 2005 || Kitt Peak || Kitt Peak Obs. ||  || align=right | 2.2 km || 
|-id=996 bgcolor=#d6d6d6
| 558996 ||  || — || April 6, 2011 || Mount Lemmon || Mount Lemmon Survey ||  || align=right | 2.9 km || 
|-id=997 bgcolor=#d6d6d6
| 558997 ||  || — || October 2, 2013 || Kitt Peak || Spacewatch ||  || align=right | 2.6 km || 
|-id=998 bgcolor=#d6d6d6
| 558998 ||  || — || September 26, 2003 || Apache Point || SDSS Collaboration ||  || align=right | 1.9 km || 
|-id=999 bgcolor=#d6d6d6
| 558999 ||  || — || September 12, 2007 || Mount Lemmon || Mount Lemmon Survey || EOS || align=right | 1.8 km || 
|-id=000 bgcolor=#d6d6d6
| 559000 ||  || — || September 9, 2007 || Kitt Peak || Spacewatch ||  || align=right | 2.8 km || 
|}

References

External links 
 Discovery Circumstances: Numbered Minor Planets (555001)–(560000) (IAU Minor Planet Center)

0558